The moths of South Africa represent about 7,000 known moth species. The moths (mostly nocturnal) and butterflies (mostly diurnal) together make up the taxonomic order Lepidoptera.

This is a list of moth species which have been recorded in South Africa. Because of the large number of species from South Africa, some families are listed on separate pages.

Family Acrolepiidae
Acrolepia canachopis Meyrick, 1913
Acrolepia chalarodesma Meyrick, 1927
Acrolepia gelida Meyrick, 1921
Acrolepia trapezopa Meyrick, 1914
Acrolepia xylophragma (Meyrick, 1926)

Family Adelidae
Adela cuneella Walsingham, 1891
Adela droseropa Meyrick, 1921
Adela electella (Walker, 1863)
Adela natalensis Stainton, 1860
Ceromitia albosparsa Janse, 1945
Ceromitia alternipunctella (Walsingham, 1881)
Ceromitia amphichroa Meyrick, 1908
Ceromitia arata Meyrick, 1920
Ceromitia benedicta Meyrick, 1918
Ceromitia bipartita (Janse, 1945)
Ceromitia bipectinifera Janse, 1945
Ceromitia brevilobata (Janse, 1945)
Ceromitia centrologa Meyrick, 1937
Ceromitia cerochlora Meyrick, 1921
Ceromitia crinigerella (Zeller, 1850)
Ceromitia decepta Janse, 1945
Ceromitia delta Janse, 1945
Ceromitia descripta Meyrick, 1924
Ceromitia devia (Janse, 1945)
Ceromitia dicksoni (Janse, 1945)
Ceromitia durbanica (Janse, 1945)
Ceromitia elongatella (Walsingham, 1881)
Ceromitia fuscipunctella (Janse, 1945)
Ceromitia geminata Meyrick, 1914
Ceromitia gigantea Janse, 1945
Ceromitia graptosema Meyrick, 1914
Ceromitia grisata (Janse, 1945)
Ceromitia heteroloba (Janse, 1945)
Ceromitia holosticta Meyrick, 1918
Ceromitia impura (Janse, 1945)
Ceromitia indigna (Meyrick, 1912)
Ceromitia intermedia (Janse, 1945)
Ceromitia laureata Meyrick, 1911
Ceromitia libropis Meyrick, 1908
Ceromitia melanodesma Meyrick, 1914
Ceromitia melanostrota Meyrick, 1912
Ceromitia mellicoma Meyrick, 1912
Ceromitia mioclina Meyrick, 1921
Ceromitia mitrata Meyrick, 1917
Ceromitia monopectinifera Janse, 1945
Ceromitia multipunctata Janse, 1945
Ceromitia nerina Meyrick, 1912
Ceromitia ochrotricha Meyrick, 1912
Ceromitia palyntis Meyrick, 1908
Ceromitia phaeocomoides Janse, 1945
Ceromitia phyrsima Meyrick, 1911
Ceromitia praetexta Meyrick, 1924
Ceromitia punctulata Janse, 1945
Ceromitia resonans Meyrick, 1918
Ceromitia simpliciella (Janse, 1945)
Ceromitia spatalodes Meyrick, 1920
Ceromitia spilodesma Meyrick, 1908
Ceromitia sporaea Meyrick, 1908
Ceromitia stathmodes Meyrick, 1908
Ceromitia synchroma (Janse, 1945)
Ceromitia transtrifera Meyrick, 1912
Ceromitia trigoniferella (Walsingham, 1881)
Ceromitia trilobata (Janse, 1945)
Ceromitia turpisella (Walker, 1863)
Ceromitia tyrochlora Meyrick, 1908
Ceromitia unguiphora (Janse, 1945)
Ceromitia vansoni Janse, 1945
Ceromitia wahlbergi Zeller, 1852
Ceromitia xanthosoma Meyrick, 1917

Family Alucitidae
Alucita acalyptra (Meyrick, 1913)
Alucita brachyzona (Meyrick, 1920)
Alucita butleri Wallengren, 1875
Alucita capensis Felder & Rogenhofer, 1875
Alucita certifica (Meyrick, 1909)
Alucita crococyma (Meyrick, 1937)
Alucita ferruginea Walsingham, 1881
Alucita habrophila (Meyrick, 1920)
Alucita ithycypha (Meyrick, 1927)
Alucita libraria (Meyrick, 1911)
Alucita ochriprota (Hering, 1917)
Alucita phanerarcha (Meyrick, 1924)
Alucita photaula (Meyrick, 1918)
Alucita spicifera (Meyrick, 1911)
Alucita tesserata (Meyrick, 1918)
Microschismus antennatus T. B. Fletcher, 1909
Microschismus cymatias Meyrick, 1918
Microschismus fortis (Walsingham, 1881)
Microschismus premnias Meyrick, 1913
Microschismus reginus Ustjuzhanin & Kovtunovich, 2011
Microschismus sceletias Meyrick, 1911
Microschismus sterkfontein Ustjuzhanin & Kovtunovich, 2011

Family Anomoeotidae
Anomoeotes levis Felder, 1888
Anomoeotes nigrivenosus Butler, 1893
Dianeura goochii Butler, 1888

Family Arctiidae
About 239 species - see: List of moths of South Africa (Arctiidae)

Family Autostichidae
Diophila bathrota (Meyrick, 1911)
Hesperesta rhyodes (Meyrick, 1909)
Holcopogon tucki Vives Moreno, 1999
Oegoconia meledantis (Meyrick, 1921)
Oegoconia syndesma Meyrick, 1926
Pachnistis craniota (Meyrick, 1913)
Procometis acharma Meyrick, 1908
Procometis limitata Meyrick, 1911
Procometis milvina Meyrick, 1914
Procometis ochricilia Meyrick, 1921
Procometis oxypora Meyrick, 1908
Procometis terrena Meyrick, 1908
Symmoca crocodesma Meyrick, 1911

Family Batrachedridae
Batrachedra epombra Meyrick, 1914
Batrachedra granosa Meyrick, 1911
Batrachedra heliota Meyrick, 1913
Batrachedra isochtha Meyrick, 1914
Batrachedra microbias Meyrick, 1914
Batrachedra oemias Meyrick, 1909
Batrachedra phaneropa Meyrick, 1914
Batrachedra saurota Meyrick, 1911
Batrachedra stegodyphobia Walsingham, 1903
Enscepastra lathraea Meyrick, 1920
Enscepastra longirostris Meyrick, 1926
Enscepastra plagiopa Meyrick, 1920
Idioglossa bigemma Walsingham, 1881

Family Bedelliidae
Bedellia cathareuta Meyrick, 1911
Bedellia somnulentella (Zeller, 1847)

Family Bombycidae
Bombyx mori (Linnaeus, 1758)
Ocinara ficicola (Westwood & Ormerod, 1889)
Racinoa ianthe (Druce, 1887)
Racinoa pallicornis Strand, 1910
Racinoa signicosta Strand, 1910

Family Brachodidae
Atractoceros albiciliata (Walsingham, 1891)
Atractoceros xanthoprocta (Meyrick, 1914)
Brachodes infandus (Meyrick, 1920)
Brachodes metaspilus (Meyrick, 1926)
Brachodes nycteropis (Meyrick, 1920)
Brachodes quiris (Felder & Rogenhofer, 1875)
Nigilgia albitogata (Walsingham, 1891)
Nigilgia eucallynta (Meyrick, 1937)
Nigilgia pseliota (Meyrick, 1920)
Phycodes punctata Walsingham, 1891

Family Brahmaeidae
Dactyloceras widenmanni (Karsch, 1895)
Spiramiopsis comma Hampson, 1901

Family Bucculatricidae
Bucculatrix agilis Meyrick, 1920
Bucculatrix amara Meyrick, 1913
Bucculatrix anticolona Meyrick, 1913
Bucculatrix dulcis Meyrick, 1913
Bucculatrix edocta Meyrick, 1921
Bucculatrix facilis Meyrick, 1911
Bucculatrix galeodes Meyrick, 1913
Bucculatrix inchoata Meyrick, 1913
Bucculatrix lenis Meyrick, 1913
Bucculatrix melipecta Meyrick, 1914
Bucculatrix monelpis Meyrick, 1928
Bucculatrix ochromeris Meyrick, 1928
Bucculatrix porthmisa Meyrick, 1908
Bucculatrix praecipua Meyrick, 1918
Bucculatrix quieta Meyrick, 1913
Leucoedemia ingens (Scoble & Scholtz, 1984)

Family Carposinidae
Carposina autologa Meyrick, 1910
Carposina brachycentra Meyrick, 1914
Carposina conobathra Meyrick, 1928
Carposina exsanguis Meyrick, 1918
Carposina impavida Meyrick, 1913
Carposina irata Meyrick, 1914
Carposina proconsularis Meyrick, 1921
Carposina siturga Meyrick, 1912
Carposina socors Meyrick, 1928
Carposina subselliata Meyrick, 1921
Carposina thermurga Meyrick, 1929

Family Cecidosidae
Scyrotis athleta Meyrick, 1909
Scyrotis granosa (Meyrick, 1912)
Scyrotis kochi Mey, 2007
Scyrotis pulleni Mey, 2007
Scyrotis trivialis (Meyrick, 1913)

Family Choreutidae
Brenthia leucatoma Meyrick, 1918
Brenthia virginalis Meyrick, 1912
Choreutis aegyptiaca (Zeller, 1867)
Choreutis entechna (Meyrick, 1920)
Choreutis gratiosa (Meyrick, 1911)
Choreutis plectodes (Meyrick, 1921)
Tebenna micalis (Mann, 1857)

Family Coleophoridae
Anathyrsa macroxyla Meyrick, 1920
Augasma nidifica Meyrick, 1912
Blastobasis byrsodepta Meyrick, 1913
Blastobasis determinata Meyrick, 1921
Blastobasis egens Meyrick, 1918
Blastobasis fatigata Meyrick, 1914
Blastobasis industria Meyrick, 1913
Blastobasis millicentae Adamski, 2010
Blastobasis taricheuta Meyrick, 1909
Calosima arguta (Meyrick, 1918)
Coleophora acmura Meyrick, 1914
Coleophora aphanombra Meyrick, 1913
Coleophora diffusa Meyrick, 1913
Coleophora efflua Meyrick, 1911
Coleophora eremodes Meyrick, 1912
Coleophora halmodes Meyrick, 1911
Coleophora illustrata Meyrick, 1913
Coleophora intensa Meyrick, 1913
Coleophora leucaula Meyrick, 1911
Coleophora megaloptila Meyrick, 1909
Coleophora niphocrossa Meyrick, 1920
Coleophora ordinaria Meyrick, 1913
Coleophora orphnoceros Meyrick, 1937
Coleophora oxyphaea Meyrick, 1913
Coleophora presbytica Meyrick, 1921
Coleophora scaleuta Meyrick, 1911
Coleophora scariphota Meyrick, 1911
Coleophora terenaula Meyrick, 1927
Coleophora textoria Meyrick, 1921
Coleophora triflua Meyrick, 1911
Holcocera extensa (Meyrick, 1918)
Holcocera irroratella (Walsingham, 1891)
Kruegerius terebratus (Meyrick, 1924)

Family Copromorphidae
Copromorpha aeruginea Meyrick, 1917
Rhynchoferella syncentra (Meyrick, 1916)

Family Cosmopterigidae
Alloclita paraphracta Meyrick, 1914
Alloclita xylodesma Meyrick, 1911
Allotalanta clonomicta Meyrick, 1927
Anatrachyntis rileyi (Walsingham, 1882)
Anatrachyntis tripola (Meyrick, 1909)
Ascalenia albitergis Meyrick, 1926
Ascalenia melanogastra (Meyrick, 1918)
Ascalenia nudicornis (Meyrick, 1913)
Ascalenia pulverata (Meyrick, 1913)
Ascalenia staurocentra (Meyrick, 1915)
Axiarcha discosema Meyrick, 1921
Chalcocolona cyananthes (Meyrick, 1911)
Cnemidolophus lavernellus Walsingham, 1881
Cosmopterix ancistraea Meyrick, 1913
Cosmopterix antichorda Meyrick, 1909
Cosmopterix bactrophora Meyrick, 1908
Cosmopterix callinympha Meyrick, 1913
Cosmopterix circe Meyrick, 1921
Cosmopterix cleophanes Meyrick, 1937
Cosmopterix cognita Walsingham, 1891
Cosmopterix diplozona Meyrick, 1921
Cosmopterix emmolybda Meyrick, 1914
Cosmopterix macroglossa Meyrick, 1913
Cosmopterix oxyglossa Meyrick, 1909
Cosmopterix scaligera Meyrick, 1909
Cosmopterix tabellaria Meyrick, 1908
Cosmopterix tetrophthalma Meyrick, 1921
Dorodoca eometalla Meyrick, 1926
Erechthiodes audax Meyrick, 1914
Eteobalea pentagama Meyrick, 1928
Eteobalea phanoptila Meyrick, 1911
Eteobalea quinquecristata (Walsingham, 1891)
Gibeauxiella genitrix (Meyrick, 1927)
Gisilia antidesma (Meyrick, 1913)
Gisilia cardinata (Meyrick, 1918)
Gisilia conformata (Meyrick, 1921)
Gisilia sclerodes (Meyrick, 1909)
Gisilia stagnans (Meyrick, 1921)
Hyalochna allevata Meyrick, 1918
Ischnobathra balanobola Meyrick, 1937
Ischnobathra dormiens Meyrick, 1937
Labdia caulota Meyrick, 1918
Labdia diophanes Meyrick, 1927
Limnaecia chlorodeta Meyrick, 1928
Limnaecia chloronephes Meyrick, 1924
Limnaecia effulgens Meyrick, 1918
Limnaecia eretmota Meyrick, 1909
Limnaecia ichnographa Meyrick, 1908
Limnaecia neurogramma Meyrick, 1909
Limnaecia recidiva Meyrick, 1911
Limnaecia semisecta Meyrick, 1928
Macrobathra anisodora Meyrick, 1924
Macrobathra recrepans Meyrick, 1926
Melanozestis heterodesma Meyrick, 1930
Parathystas porphyrantha Meyrick, 1913
Pycnagorastis tanyopa Meyrick, 1937
Pyroderces narcota (Meyrick, 1909)
Stagmatophora basanistis Meyrick, 1909
Stagmatophora phalacra Meyrick, 1909
Stagmatophora pilana Meyrick, 1913
Stagmatophora trimitra Meyrick, 1913
Stilbosis antibathra (Meyrick, 1914)
Streptothyris tanyacta Meyrick, 1918

Family Cossidae
Aethalopteryx forsteri (Clench, 1959)
Aethalopteryx pindarus (Fawcett, 1916)
Aethalopteryx squameus (Distant, 1902)
Aethalopteryx tristis (Gaede, 1915)
Alophonotus rauanus (Strand, 1909)
Arctiocossus antargyreus Felder, 1874
Arctiocossus danieli Clench, 1959
Arctiocossus impeditus (Walker, 1865)
Arctiocossus ligatus (Walker, 1865)
Arctiocossus tessellatus Clench, 1959
Azygophleps asylas (Cramer, 1777)
Azygophleps atrifasciata Hampson, 1910
Azygophleps cooksoni Pinhey, 1968
Azygophleps inclusa (Walker, 1856)
Azygophleps leopardina Distant, 1902
Azygophleps pusilla (Walker, 1856)
Brachylia eutelia Clench, 1959
Brachylia incanescens (Butler, 1875)
Brachylia terebroides Felder, 1874
Coryphodema albifasciata Hampson, 1910
Coryphodema tristis (Drury, 1782)
Cossus seineri Grünberg, 1910
Eulophonotus myrmeleon Felder, 1874
Macrocossus coelebs Clench, 1959
Macrocossus toluminus (Druce, 1887)
Nomima cyanoscia (Meyrick, 1918)
Nomima subnigrata (Meyrick, 1917)
Oreocossus occidentalis Strand, 1913
Pecticossus castaneus Gaede, 1929
Phragmataecia andarana Clench, 1959
Phragmataecia boisduvalii (Herrich-Schäffer, 1854)
Phragmataecia innominata Dalla Torre, 1923
Phragmataecia irrorata Hampson, 1910
Phragmataecia okovangae Clench, 1959
Pseudurgis leucosema Meyrick, 1914
Pseudurgis nephelicta Meyrick, 1913
Pseudurgis ochrolychna Meyrick, 1914
Pseudurgis poliastis (Meyrick, 1937)
Pseudurgis polychorda Meyrick, 1913
Pseudurgis protracta Meyrick, 1924
Pseudurgis sciocolona Meyrick, 1914
Pseudurgis scutifera Meyrick, 1912
Pseudurgis tectonica Meyrick, 1908
Pseudurgis undulata (Meyrick, 1911)
Rethona strigosa Walker, 1855
Strigocossus capensis (Walker, 1856)
Strigocossus ochricosta (T. B. Fletcher, 1968)
Xyleutes dictyotephra Clench, 1959
Xyleutes sjoestedti (Aurivillius, 1900)
Xyleutes vosseleri Gaede, 1929
Zeuzera coffeae Nietner, 1861
Zeuzera sponda Wallengren, 1875

Family Crambidae
About 407 species - see: List of moths of South Africa (Crambidae)

Family Drepanidae
Aethiopsestis austrina Watson, 1965
Aethiopsestis echinata Watson, 1965
Epicampoptera notialis Watson, 1965
Marplena designina Lane, 1973
Negera natalensis (Felder, 1874)

Family Dudgeoneidae
Dudgeonea leucosticta Hampson, 1900

Family Elachistidae
Agonopterix communis (Meyrick, 1920)
Agonopterix compacta (Meyrick, 1914)
Agonopterix crypsicosma (Meyrick, 1920)
Agonopterix dryocrates (Meyrick, 1921)
Agonopterix glyphidopa (Meyrick, 1828)
Agonopterix goughi (Bradley, 1958)
Agonopterix grammatopa (Meyrick, 1920)
Agonopterix homogenes (Meyrick, 1920)
Agonopterix melanarcha (Meyrick, 1913)
Agonopterix neoxesta (Meyrick, 1918)
Agonopterix trimenella (Walsingham, 1881)
Colonophora ictifera Meyrick, 1937
Cryptolechia castella (Zeller, 1852)
Cryptolechia straminella (Zeller, 1852)
Depressaria clausulata Meyrick, 1911
Depressaria orthobathra Meyrick, 1918
Depressaria panurga Meyrick, 1920
Depressaria prospicua Meyrick, 1914
Depressaria rhodoscelis Meyrick, 1920
Elachista chelonitis Meyrick, 1909
Elachista crocogastra Meyrick, 1908
Elachista gypsophila Meyrick, 1911
Elachista inscia (Meyrick, 1913)
Elachista justificata Meyrick, 1926
Elachista merimnaea Meyrick, 1920
Elachista nymphaea Meyrick, 1911
Elachista sparsula Meyrick, 1921
Ethmia circumdatella (Walker, 1863)
Ethmia coscineutis Meyrick, 1912
Ethmia dactylia Meyrick, 1912
Ethmia glandifera Meyrick, 1918
Ethmia hamaxastra Meyrick, 1930
Ethmia leucocirrha Meyrick, 1926
Ethmia livida (Zeller, 1852)
Ethmia oculigera (Möschler, 1883)
Ethmia pericentrota Meyrick, 1926
Ethmia rhomboidella Walsingham, 1897
Ethmia sabiella (Felder & Rogenhofer, 1875)
Eutorna diluvialis Meyrick, 1913
Haplochrois ganota Meyrick, 1911
Haplochrois halans Meyrick, 1924
Haplochrois hysterota (Meyrick, 1918)
Ischnopsis angustella Walsingham, 1881
Ischnopsis melanogma (Meyrick, 1908)
Ischnopsis pilifera (Meyrick, 1921)
Martyrhilda melanarga (Meyrick, 1913)
Microcolona omphalias Meyrick, 1913
Microcolona pantomima Meyrick, 1917
Myrrhinitis sporeuta Meyrick, 1913
Orophia ammopleura (Meyrick, 1920)
Orophia eariasella (Walker, 1864)
Orophia haeresiella (Wallengren, 1875)
Orophia ochroxyla (Meyrick, 1937)
Orophia roseoflavida (Walsingham, 1881)
Orophia tetrasticta (Meyrick, 1917)
Orophia tranquilla (Meyrick, 1927)
Orophia transfuga (Meyrick, 1911)
Orophia xanthosarca (Meyrick, 1917)
Pauroptila galenitis Meyrick, 1913
Perittia aganopa (Meyrick, 1911)
Perittia nimbifera (Meyrick, 1913)
Perittia secutrix (Meyrick, 1914)
Phthinostoma infumata Meyrick, 1914
Phthinostoma pachyzona Meyrick, 1921
Pisinidea exsuperans Meyrick, 1920
Porotica astragalis Meyrick, 1913
Stenoma dicentra Meyrick, 1913
Stenoma modicola Meyrick, 1911
Stenoma reticens Meyrick, 1917
Stenoma simulatrix Meyrick, 1914
Stenoma stolida Meyrick, 1911
Trachydora iocharis Meyrick, 1918
Trachydora rhachitis Meyrick, 1913
Trachydora scandalotis Meyrick, 1921

Family Epermeniidae
Epermenia conioptila Meyrick, 1921
Epermenia criticodes Meyrick, 1913
Epermenia ithycentra Meyrick, 1926
Epermenia ochrodesma Meyrick, 1913
Epermenia proserga Meyrick, 1913
Ochromolopis praefumata (Meyrick, 1911)
Temeluchella xeropa (Meyrick, 1909)

Family Epipyropidae
Epipyrops fulvipunctata Distant, 1913

Family Eriocottidae
Compsoctena aedifica (Meyrick, 1908)
Compsoctena africanella (Strand, 1909)
Compsoctena agria (Meyrick, 1909)
Compsoctena autoderma (Meyrick, 1914)
Compsoctena brachyctenis (Meyrick, 1909)
Compsoctena connexalis (Walker, 1863)
Compsoctena cyclatma (Meyrick, 1908)
Compsoctena delocrossa (Meyrick, 1921)
Compsoctena dermatodes (Meyrick, 1914)
Compsoctena expers (Meyrick, 1911)
Compsoctena fossoria (Meyrick, 1920)
Compsoctena furciformis (Meyrick, 1921)
Compsoctena isopetra (Meyrick, 1921)
Compsoctena lycophanes (Meyrick, 1924)
Compsoctena melitoploca (Meyrick, 1927)
Compsoctena microctenis (Meyrick, 1914)
Compsoctena numeraria (Meyrick, 1914)
Compsoctena ochrastis (Meyrick, 1937)
Compsoctena ostracitis (Meyrick, 1913)
Compsoctena primella Zeller, 1852
Compsoctena psammosticha (Meyrick, 1921)
Compsoctena quassa (Meyrick, 1921)
Compsoctena rudis (Meyrick, 1921)
Compsoctena scriba (Meyrick, 1921)
Compsoctena spilophanes (Meyrick, 1921)
Compsoctena talarodes (Meyrick, 1927)
Compsoctena terrestris (Meyrick, 1914)
Eucryptogona secularis Meyrick, 1918

Family Eupterotidae
Bantuana cregoei Distant, 1906
Camerunia flava Aurivillius, 1904
Cyrtojana trilineata Aurivillius, 1911
Hemijana griseola Rothschild, 1917
Hemijana subrosea (Aurivillius, 1893)
Hibrildes crawshayi Butler, 1896
Hoplojana rhodoptera (Gerstaecker, 1871)

Jana eurymas Herrich-Schäffer, 1854
Jana nigristriata Janse, 1915
Jana tantalus Herrich-Schäffer, 1854
Janomima dannfelti (Aurivillius, 1893)
Janomima mariana (White, 1843)
Lichenopteryx despecta Felder, 1874
Marmaroplegma conspersa Aurivillius, 1921
Marmaroplegma paragarda Wallengren, 1860
Marmaroplegma unicolor Janse, 1915
Paraphyllalia degenera (Walker, 1855)
Phiala albidorsata Gaede, 1927
Phiala bistrigata Aurivillius, 1901
Phiala costipuncta (Herrich-Schäffer, 1855)
Phiala crassistriga Strand, 1911
Phiala dasypoda Wallengren, 1860
Phiala flavipennis Wallengren, 1875
Phiala hologramma (Aurivillius, 1904)
Phiala incana Distant, 1897
Phiala marshalli Aurivillius, 1904
Phiala nigrolineata Aurivillius, 1903
Phiala niveociliata Strand, 1911
Phiala polita Distant, 1897
Phiala pretoriana Wichgraf, 1908
Phiala pseudatomaria Strand, 1911
Phiala pulverea Distant, 1903
Phiala similis Aurivillius, 1911
Phiala simplex Aurivillius, 1904
Phiala wichgrafi Strand, 1911
Phyllalia alboradiata Aurivillius, 1911
Phyllalia flavicostata Fawcett, 1903
Phyllalia patens (Boisduval, 1847)
Phyllalia thunbergii (Boisduval, 1847)
Phyllalia umbripennis Strand, 1911
Phyllalia valida (Felder, 1874)
Phyllalia ziczac (Strand, 1911)
Poloma angulata Walker, 1855
Poloma castanea Aurivillius, 1901
Poloma nigromaculata Aurivillius, 1893
Pterocerota virginea Hampson, 1905
Rhabdosia patagiata (Aurivillius, 1911)
Rhabdosia vaninia (Stoll, 1781)
Schistissa uniformis Aurivillius, 1901
Stenoglene bicolor (Distant, 1897)
Stenoglene decellei Dall'Asta & Poncin, 1980
Stenoglene hilaris Felder, 1874
Stenoglene livingstonensis (Strand, 1909)
Stenoglene nahor Druce, 1896
Stenoglene obtusus (Walker, 1864)
Stenoglene pira Druce, 1896
Stenoglene roseus (Druce, 1886)
Striphnopteryx edulis (Boisduval, 1847)
Tissanga pretoriae (Distant, 1892)

Family Gelechiidae
About 502 species - see: List of moths of South Africa (Gelechiidae)

Family Geometridae
About 976 species - see: List of moths of South Africa (Geometridae)

Family Glyphipterigidae
Chrysocentris chrysozona (Meyrick, 1921)
Chrysocentris urania Meyrick, 1920
Glyphipterix amphipeda Meyrick, 1920
Glyphipterix argophracta Meyrick, 1926
Glyphipterix bohemani (Zeller, 1852)
Glyphipterix callithea Meyrick, 1921
Glyphipterix climacaspis Meyrick, 1920
Glyphipterix decachrysa Meyrick, 1918
Glyphipterix diplotoxa Meyrick, 1920
Glyphipterix ditiorana Walker, 1863
Glyphipterix grapholithoides (Walsingham, 1891)
Glyphipterix idiomorpha Meyrick, 1917
Glyphipterix medica Meyrick, 1911
Glyphipterix ortholeuca Meyrick, 1921
Glyphipterix oxytricha Meyrick, 1928
Glyphipterix stelucha Meyrick, 1909
Tetracmanthes astrocosma Meyrick, 1925
Ussara polyastra Meyrick, 1937

Family Gracillariidae
Acrocercops chrysophylli Vári, 1961
Acrocercops combreticola Vári, 1961
Acrocercops ficina Vári, 1961
Acrocercops gossypii Vári, 1961
Acrocercops heterodoxa Meyrick, 1912
Acrocercops ochnifolii Vári, 1961
Acrocercops punctulata Walsingham, 1891
Acrocercops syzygiena Vári, 1961
Acrocercops terminalina Vári, 1961
Amblyptila cynanchi Vári, 1961
Amblyptila strophanthina Vári, 1961
Aristaea bathracma (Meyrick, 1912)
Aristaea eurygramma Vári, 1961
Aristaea onychota (Meyrick, 1908)
Aristaea thalassias (Meyrick, 1880)
Aspilapteryx filifera (Meyrick, 1912)
Aspilapteryx grypota (Meyrick, 1914)
Aspilapteryx seriata (Meyrick, 1912)
Callicercops triceros (Meyrick, 1926)
Caloptilia aurita Triberti, 1989
Caloptilia azaleella (Brants, 1913)
Caloptilia cataractias (Meyrick, 1921)
Caloptilia celtina Vári, 1961
Caloptilia chrysoplaca Vári, 1961
Caloptilia corrugata (Meyrick, 1918)
Caloptilia dicksoni Vári, 1961
Caloptilia isotoma (Meyrick, 1914)
Caloptilia leptophanes (Meyrick, 1928)
Caloptilia leptospila Vári, 1961
Caloptilia macropleura (Meyrick, 1932)
Caloptilia meyricki Vári, 1961
Caloptilia octopunctata (Turner, 1894)
Caloptilia pentaplaca (Meyrick, 1911)
Caloptilia poecilostola Vári, 1961
Caloptilia porphyranthes (Meyrick, 1921)
Caloptilia prosticta (Meyrick, 1909)
Caloptilia pyrrhochroma Vári, 1961
Caloptilia rhusina Vári, 1961
Caloptilia sapina Vári, 1961
Caloptilia semnophanes (Meyrick, 1918)
Caloptilia syngenica Vári, 1961
Caloptilia titanitis (Meyrick, 1921)
Caloptilia vibrans (Meyrick, 1918)
Caloptilia vicinola Vári, 1961
Caloptilia xanthocephala Vári, 1961
Caloptilia xanthochiria Vári, 1961
Cameraria hexalobina (Vári, 1961)
Cameraria varii de Prins, 2012
Conopobathra carbunculata (Meyrick, 1912)
Conopobathra geraea Vári, 1961
Conopobathra gravissima (Meyrick, 1912)
Conopomorpha chionosema Vári, 1961
Conopomorpha euphanes Vári, 1961
Conopomorpha fustigera (Meyrick, 1928)
Conopomorphina aptata (Meyrick, 1914)
Conopomorphina ochnivora Vári, 1961
Corethrovalva allophylina Vári, 1961
Corethrovalva goniosema Vári, 1961
Corethrovalva paraplesia Vári, 1961
Corythoxestis cyanolampra Vári, 1961
Cryptolectica capnodecta Vári, 1961
Cryptolectica euryphanta (Meyrick, 1911)
Cryptolectica monodecta (Meyrick, 1912)
Cuphodes diospyri Vári, 1961
Cuphodes dolichocera Vári, 1961
Cuphodes leucocera Vári, 1961
Cuphodes melanostola (Meyrick, 1918)
Dialectica carcharota (Meyrick, 1912)
Dialectica columellina (Vári, 1961)
Dialectica cordiaecola Vári, 1961
Dialectica ehretiae (Vári, 1961)
Dialectica galactozona Vári, 1961
Dialectica odontosema (Vári, 1961)
Dialectica pavonicola (Vári, 1961)
Dialectica praegemina (Meyrick, 1917)
Dialectica pyramidota (Meyrick, 1918)
Dialectica trigonidota (Vári, 1961)
Diphtheroptila brideliae Vári, 1961
Diphtheroptila oxyloga (Meyrick, 1928)
Ectropina citricula (Meyrick, 1912)
Ectropina ligata (Meyrick, 1912)
Ectropina sclerochitoni Vári, 1961
Epicephala haplodoxa Vári, 1961
Epicephala homostola Vári, 1961
Epicephala pelopepla Vári, 1961
Epicephala pyrrhogastra Meyrick, 1908
Epicephala tephrostola Vári, 1961
Euspilapteryx crypta Vári, 1961
Graphiocephala barbitias (Meyrick, 1909)
Graphiocephala polysticha Vári, 1961
Graphiocephala strigifera Vári, 1961
Lamprolectica apicistrigata (Walsingham, 1891)
Leucocercops dasmophora (Meyrick, 1908)
Liocrobyla tephrosiae Vári, 1961
Macarostola flora (Meyrick, 1926)
Macarostola noellineae Vári, 2002
Metacercops praestricta (Meyrick, 1918)
Metriochroa pergulariae Vári, 1961
Metriochroa tylophorae Vári, 1961
Oligoneurina ficicola Vári, 1961
Pareclectis adelospila Vári, 1961
Pareclectis invita (Meyrick, 1912)
Pareclectis leucosticha Vári, 1961
Pareclectis prionota (Meyrick, 1928)
Phodoryctis dolichophila (Vári, 1961)
Phodoryctis thrypticosema (Vári, 1961)
Phyllocnistis citrella Stainton, 1856
Phyllocnistis pharetrucha Meyrick, 1921
Phyllocnistis saligna (Zeller, 1839)
Phyllonorycter anchistea (Vári, 1961)
Phyllonorycter brachylaenae (Vári, 1961)
Phyllonorycter didymopa (Vári, 1961)
Phyllonorycter dombeyae de Prins, 2012
Phyllonorycter encaeria (Meyrick, 1911)
Phyllonorycter grewiaecola (Vári, 1961)
Phyllonorycter grewiella (Vári, 1961)
Phyllonorycter hibiscina (Vári, 1961)
Phyllonorycter lantanae (Vári, 1961)
Phyllonorycter loxozona (Meyrick, 1936)
Phyllonorycter melanosparta (Meyrick, 1912)
Phyllonorycter melhaniae (Meyrick, 1912)
Phyllonorycter pavoniae (Vári, 1961)
Phyllonorycter rhynchosiae (Vári, 1961)
Phyllonorycter tsavensis de Prins, 2012
Pleiomorpha dystacta Vári, 1961
Pleiomorpha eumeces Vári, 1961
Pleiomorpha habrogramma Vári, 1961
Pleiomorpha homotypa Vári, 1961
Pleiomorpha symmetra Vári, 1961
Pogonocephala veneranda (Meyrick, 1909)
Polydema hormophora (Meyrick, 1912)
Polydema vansoni Vári, 1961
Polysoma clarki Vári, 1961
Polysoma lithochrysa (Meyrick, 1930)
Porphyrosela gautengi de Prins, 2012
Porphyrosela teramni Vári, 1961
Schedocercops maeruae Vári, 1961
Semnocera procellaris (Meyrick, 1914)
Spulerina atactodesma Vári, 1961
Spulerina catapasta Vári, 1961
Spulerina hexalocha (Meyrick, 1912)
Spulerina lochmaea Vári, 1961
Spulerina marmarodes Vári, 1961
Stomphastis aphrocyma (Meyrick, 1918)
Stomphastis cardamitis (Meyrick, 1921)
Stomphastis conflua (Meyrick, 1914)
Stomphastis crotoniphila Vári, 1961
Stomphastis crotonis Vári, 1961
Stomphastis dodonaeae Vári, 1961
Stomphastis eugrapta Vári, 1961
Stomphastis mixograpta Vári, 1961
Stomphastis rorkei Vári, 1961
Stomphastis thraustica (Meyrick, 1908)
Stomphastis tremina Vári, 1961
Systoloneura randiae Vári, 1961
Telamoptilia geyeri (Vári, 1961)

Family Heliozelidae
Antispila argyrozona Meyrick, 1918
Antispila salutans Meyrick, 1921

Family Hepialidae
Afrotheora argentimaculata Nielsen & Scoble, 1986
Afrotheora minirhodaula Nielsen & Scoble, 1986
Afrotheora rhodaula (Meyrick, 1926)
Afrotheora thermodes (Meyrick, 1921)
Antihepialus antarcticus (Wallengren, 1860)
Antihepialus capeneri Janse, 1948
Antihepialus vansoni (Janse, 1942)
Eudalaca albiplumis (Warren, 1914)
Eudalaca albistriata (Hampson, 1910)
Eudalaca ammon (Wallengren, 1860)
Eudalaca amphiarma (Meyrick, 1926)
Eudalaca aurifuscalis (Janse, 1942)
Eudalaca bacotii (Quail, 1900)
Eudalaca cretata (Distant, 1897)
Eudalaca crossosema (Meyrick, 1921)
Eudalaca crudeni (Janse, 1942)
Eudalaca eriogastra (Meyrick, 1921)
Eudalaca exul (Herrich-Schäffer, [1853])
Eudalaca gutterata (Janse, 1942)
Eudalaca hololeuca (Hampson, 1910)
Eudalaca homoterma (Meyrick, 1921)
Eudalaca ibex (Wallengren, 1860)
Eudalaca infumata (Janse, 1942)
Eudalaca isorrhoa (Meyrick, 1921)
Eudalaca leniflua (Janse, 1942)
Eudalaca leucocyma (Hampson, 1910)
Eudalaca leucophaea (Janse, 1919)
Eudalaca limbopunctata (Gaede, 1930)
Eudalaca minuscula (Janse, 1942)
Eudalaca nomaqua (Walker, 1856)
Eudalaca orthocosma (Janse, 1942)
Eudalaca rivula (Janse, 1942)
Eudalaca rufescens (Hampson, 1910)
Eudalaca semicana (Janse, 1919)
Eudalaca troglodytis (Janse, 1919)
Eudalaca vaporalis (Meyrick, 1921)
Eudalaca vindex (Meyrick, 1939)
Gorgopis annulosa Gaede, 1930
Gorgopis armillata Meyrick, 1921
Gorgopis auratilis Janse, 1919
Gorgopis aurifuscata Janse, 1942
Gorgopis butlerii (Dewitz, 1881)
Gorgopis caffra Walker, 1856
Gorgopis centaurica Meyrick, 1921
Gorgopis cochlias Janse, 1942
Gorgopis crudeni Janse, 1919
Gorgopis furcata Janse, 1942
Gorgopis fuscalis Janse, 1919
Gorgopis grisescens Gaede, 1930
Gorgopis hunti Janse, 1942
Gorgopis inornata Janse, 1942
Gorgopis intervallata Warren, 1914
Gorgopis leucopetala Meyrick, 1921

Gorgopis libania (Stoll, 1781)
Gorgopis lobata Janse, 1942
Gorgopis olivaceonotata Warren, 1914
Gorgopis pallidiflava Janse, 1942
Gorgopis pholidota Meyrick, 1921
Gorgopis ptiloscelis (Meyrick, 1919)
Gorgopis serangota Janse, 1942
Gorgopis subrimosa Janse, 1942
Gorgopis zellerii Dewitz, 1881
Leto venus (Cramer, 1780)
Metahepialus anguistiptera Janse, 1948
Metahepialus plurimaculata (Warren, 1914)
Metahepialus xenoctenis (Meyrick, 1926)

Family Himantopteridae
Doratopteryx afra Rogenhofer, 1883
Doratopteryx plumigera Butler, 1888
Pedoptila nemopteridia Butler, 1885
Semioptila brachyura Hering, 1937
Semioptila flavidiscata Hampson, 1910
Semioptila fulveolans (Mabille, 1897)
Semioptila longipennis Hering, 1937
Semioptila lufirensis Joicey & Talbot, 1921
Semioptila marshalli Rothschild, 1907
Semioptila torta Butler, 1887
Semioptila trogoloba Hampson, 1920

Family Hyblaeidae
Hyblaea fontainei Berio, 1967
Hyblaea occidentalium Holland, 1894
Hyblaea puera (Cramer, 1777)

Family Immidae
Imma arsisceles Meyrick, 1937
Imma quaestoria Meyrick, 1911
Moca tormentata (Meyrick, 1921)

Family Incurvariidae
Protaephagus capensis Scoble, 1980

Family Lacturidae
Gymnogramma cyanea Meyrick, 1912
Gymnogramma eoxantha Meyrick, 1921
Gymnogramma flavivitella (Walsingham, 1881)
Gymnogramma hutchinsoni Walsingham, 1891
Gymnogramma privata Meyrick, 1924
Gymnogramma psyllodecta Meyrick, 1924
Gymnogramma pyrozancla Meyrick, 1911
Gymnogramma racemosa Meyrick, 1918
Gymnogramma rhodoneura Meyrick, 1909
Gymnogramma rufiventris (Zeller, 1852)

Family Lasiocampidae
Anadiasa affinis Aurivillius, 1911
Anadiasa fuscofasciata (Aurivillius, 1922)
Anadiasa jansei Aurivillius, 1917
Anadiasa punctifascia Walker, 1855
Anadiasa schoenheiti (Wichgraf, 1922)
Beralade jordani Tams, 1936
Beralade perobliqua Walker, 1855
Beralade signinervis Strand, 1912
Beralade wallengreni (Aurivillius, 1892)
Bombycomorpha bifascia (Walker, 1855)
Bombycomorpha dukei Joannou & Gurkovich, 2009
Bombycomorpha pallida Distant, 1897
Bombycopsis bipars (Walker, 1855)
Bombycopsis capicola Aurivillius, 1921
Bombycopsis indecora (Walker, 1865)
Bombycopsis metallicus (Distant, 1898)
Bombycopsis nigrovittata Aurivillius, 1927
Bombycopsis ochroleuca Felder, 1874
Bombycopsis venosa (Butler, 1895)
Braura ligniclusa (Walker, 1865)
Braura picturata (Grünberg, 1910)
Braura truncatum (Walker, 1855)
Catalebeda cuneilinea (Walker, 1856)
Catalebeda discocellularis Strand, 1912
Catalebeda jamesoni (Bethune-Baker, 1908)
Chondrostegoides capensis Aurivillius, 1905
Chondrostegoides jamaka Zolotuhin, 2007
Chondrostegoides magna Zolotuhin, 2007
Chondrostegoides murina (Aurivillius, 1927)
Chondrostegoides nobilorum Zolotuhin, 2007
Chondrostegoides ruficornis (Aurivillius, 1921)
Chrysopsyche bivittata Aurivillius, 1927
Chrysopsyche imparilis Aurivillius, 1905
Chrysopsyche lutulenta Tams, 1923
Cleopatrina bilinea (Walker, 1855)
Cleopatrina phocea (Druce, 1887)
Cymatopacha obscura Aurivillius, 1921
Dinometa maputuana (Wichgraf, 1906)
Dollmania cuprea (Distant, 1897)
Dollmania flavia (Fawcett, 1915)
Dollmania plinthochroa Tams, 1930
Dollmania purpurascens (Aurivillius, 1909)
Epicnapteroides fuliginosa Pinhey, 1973
Epicnapteroides marmorata Pinhey, 1973
Epitrabala argenteoguttata (Aurivillius, 1909)
Epitrabala nyassana (Aurivillius, 1909)
Eucraera gemmata (Distant, 1897)
Eucraera koellikerii (Dewitz, 1881)
Eucraera salammbo (Vuillot, 1892)
Eutricha bifascia (Walker, 1855)
Eutricha capensis (Linnaeus, 1767)
Eutricha fulvida (Distant, 1897)
Eutricha morosa (Walker, 1865)
Eutricha obscura (Walker, 1855)
Euwallengrenia rectilineata (Aurivillius, 1905)
Euwallengrenia reducta (Walker, 1855)
Gastropacha africana (Holland, 1893)
Gastropacha quercifolia (Linnaeus, 1758)
Gastroplakaeis meridionalis Aurivillius, 1901
Gonometa postica Walker, 1855
Gonometa rufobrunnea Aurivillius, 1922
Grammodora nigrolineata (Aurivillius, 1895)
Grellada enigmatica (Hering, 1941)
Haplopacha cinerea Aurivillius, 1905
Henometa clarki (Aurivillius, 1895)
Hypotrabala sanguicincta (Aurivillius, 1901)
Lasiocampa angulifera Walker, 1865
Lasiocampa quercus (Linnaeus, 1758)
Lebeda mustelina Distant, 1899
Leipoxais emarginata Aurivillius, 1911
Leipoxais peraffinis Holland, 1893
Mallocampa leighi Aurivillius, 1922
Mesocelis monticola Hübner, 1820
Metadula indecisa Walker, 1865
Metajana marshalli Aurivillius, 1909
Mimopacha knoblauchii (Dewitz, 1881)
Morongea missdebeerae Zolotuhin & Prozorov, 2010
Napta straminea (Aurivillius, 1921)
Nirbiana micha (Druce, 1899)
Ocinaropsis obscura Aurivillius, 1905
Odontocheilopteryx dollmani Tams, 1930
Odontocheilopteryx myxa Wallengren, 1860
Odontocheilopteryx obscura Aurivillius, 1927
Odontopacha fenestrata Aurivillius, 1909
Pachymeta capreolus Aurivillius, 1914
Pachymetana neavei (Aurivillius, 1915)
Pachytrina wenigina Zolotuhin & Gurkovich, 2009
Pallastica lateritia (Hering, 1928)
Pallastica lucifer Zolotuhin & Gurkovich, 2009
Pallastica pallens (Bethune-Baker, 1908)
Philotherma apithana Hering, 1928
Philotherma media Aurivillius, 1909
Philotherma obscura Aurivillius, 1927
Philotherma rennei (Dewitz, 1881)
Philotherma rosa (Druce, 1887)
Pseudolyra cervina (Aurivillius, 1905)
Pseudolyra cinerea (Aurivillius, 1901)
Pseudolyra distincta (Distant, 1899)
Pseudometa basalis (Walker, 1865)
Pseudometa dollmani Tams, 1925
Pseudometa viola Aurivillius, 1901
Rhinobombyx cuneata Aurivillius, 1879
Schausinna clementsi (Schaus, 1897)
Schausinna regia (Grünberg, 1910)
Sena breyeri (Aurivillius, 1922)
Sena donaldsoni (Holland, 1901)
Sena levenna (Wallengren, 1875)
Sena parva (Aurivillius, 1921)
Sena prompta (Walker, 1855)
Sena simplex (Aurivillius, 1905)
Stoermeriana aculeata (Walker, 1865)
Stoermeriana amphilecta (Tams, 1936)
Stoermeriana distinguenda (Aurivillius, 1905)
Stoermeriana fusca (Aurivillius, 1905)
Stoermeriana singulare (Aurivillius, 1893)
Streblote bimaculatum (Walker, 1865)
Streblote capensis (Aurivillius, 1905)
Streblote concavum (Strand, 1912)
Streblote concolor (Walker, 1855)
Streblote cristata (Stoll, 1782)
Streblote cupreum (Distant, 1899)
Streblote jansei (Tams, 1936)
Streblote polydora (Druce, 1887)
Streblote uniforme (Aurivillius, 1927)
Trichiurana meridionalis Aurivillius, 1921

Trichopisthia igneotincta (Aurivillius, 1909)
Trichopisthia monteiroi (Druce, 1887)

Family Lecithoceridae
Atrichozancla cosymbota (Meyrick, 1920)
Atrichozancla gymnopalpa Janse, 1963
Atrichozancla phaeocrossis (Meyrick, 1937)
Cophomantella bifrenata (Meyrick, 1921)
Cophomantella furnaria (Meyrick, 1913)
Cophomantella homogramma (Meyrick, 1918)
Dragmatucha bivia Meyrick, 1918
Dragmatucha proaula Meyrick, 1908
Epimactis atropunctella (Walsingham, 1881)
Homaloxestis cholopis (Meyrick, 1906)
Homaloxestis lophophora Janse, 1954
Idiopteryx obliquella (Walsingham, 1881)
Isotypa discopuncta Janse, 1954
Lecithocera aenicta Janse, 1954
Lecithocera anthologella Wallengren, 1875
Lecithocera binotata Meyrick, 1918
Lecithocera flavipalpis Walsingham, 1891
Lecithocera ideologa Meyrick, 1937
Lecithocera lucernata Meyrick, 1913
Lecithocera myopa Meyrick, 1913
Lecithocera officinalis Meyrick, 1911
Odites assidua Meyrick, 1914
Odites balsamias Meyrick, 1911
Odites citrantha Meyrick, 1908
Odites consignata Meyrick, 1921
Odites crocota Meyrick, 1912
Odites dilutella (Walsingham, 1881)
Odites emensa Meyrick, 1921
Odites exterrita Meyrick, 1937
Odites fessa Meyrick, 1921
Odites hemipercna Meyrick, 1914
Odites insons Meyrick, 1912
Odites inversa Meyrick, 1914
Odites laconica Meyrick, 1927
Odites meloxantha Meyrick, 1927
Odites metaclista Meyrick, 1915
Odites metaphracta Meyrick, 1909
Odites metascia Meyrick, 1937
Odites natalensis Walsingham, 1891
Odites nubeculosa Meyrick, 1918
Odites obumbrata Meyrick, 1925
Odites obvia Meyrick, 1914
Odites sucinea Meyrick, 1915
Odites superscripta Meyrick, 1926
Plagiocrossa picrodora (Meyrick, 1913)
Protolychnis maculata (Walsingham, 1881)
Protolychnis marginata (Walsingham, 1891)

Family Lemoniidae
Sabalia picarina Walker, 1865
Sabalia thalia Fawcett, 1915

Family Limacodidae
Afraltha chionostola (Hampson, 1910)
Afraltha luxuriosa (Hering, 1928)
Afrobirthama flaccidia (Druce, 1899)
Afrobirthama hobohmi Janse, 1964
Afrobirthama reducta Hering, 1928
Afromiresa ustitermina (Hampson, 1910)
Apluda plebeja Wallengren, 1863
Apreptophanes stevensoni Janse, 1964
Arctozygaena quinquemaculata Gaede, 1926
Astatophlebia marmarobrunnea Janse, 1964
Brachia albiviata (Hampson, 1910)
Brachia amblygrapta Janse, 1964
Brachia breijeri (Janse, 1964)
Brachypecta perobliqua Janse, 1964
Caffricola cloeckneria (Stoll, 1781)
Caffricola kenyensis Talbot, 1932
Caffricola vicina Alberti, 1954
Chrysamma amabilis Clench, 1955
Chrysamma purpuripulcra Karsch, 1896
Chrysopoloma bicolor (Distant, 1897)
Chrysopoloma flaviceps Aurivillius, 1901
Chrysopoloma isabellina Aurivillius, 1895
Chrysopoloma pallens Hering, 1923
Chrysopoloma paupera Hering, 1925
Chrysopoloma restricta Distant, 1899
Chrysopoloma rudis (Walker, 1865)
Chrysopoloma similis Aurivillius, 1895
Chrysopoloma varia Distant, 1899
Coenobasis albiramosa (Walker, 1865)
Coenobasis amoena Felder, 1874
Coenobasis hemichlora Grünberg, 1910
Coenobasis intermedia Janse, 1964
Coenobasis panochra Janse, 1964
Coenobasis turneri West, 1937
Cosuma polana Druce, 1887
Crothaema conspicua Janse, 1964
Crothaema decorata Distant, 1892
Crothaema schoutedeni Hering, 1954
Ctenolita melanosticta (Bethune-Baker, 1909)
Delorhachis kilosa West, 1940
Deltoptera iphia Janse, 1964
Ectropa ancilis Wallengren, 1863
Exanthica atelacma Meyrick, 1926
Exanthica trigonella (Felder & Rogenhofer, 1875)
Gavara velutina Walker, 1857
Halseyia basiclara (Hering, 1937)
Halseyia bisecta (Butler, 1898)
Halseyia biumbrata (Hampson, 1910)
Halseyia intacta (Hering, 1937)
Halseyia pseudobisecta (Hering, 1937)
Halseyia rectifascia (Hering, 1937)
Halseyia tamsi (Hering, 1937)
Hamartia clarissa Hering, 1937
Hamartia medora Hering, 1937
Homosusica eugrapha Janse, 1964
Inous nigripalpis Walker, 1855
Isozinara pallidifascia Janse, 1964
Jordaniana lactea (Pagenstecher, 1903)
Latoia albicosta (Hampson, 1910)
Latoia anagaura Janse, 1964
Latoia eremotropha Janse, 1964
Latoia johannes (Distant, 1898)
Latoia latistriga (Walker, 1855)
Latoia nivosa (Felder, 1874)
Latoia urda (Druce, 1887)
Latoia viridifascia Holland, 1893
Latoia viridimixta Janse, 1964
Latoia vitilena (Karsch, 1896)
Latoia vivida (Walker, 1865)
Latoiola pusilla (Aurivillius, 1900)
Macroplectra meridionalis Hering, 1928
Macroplectra rufopallens Hampson, 1910
Macroplectra tripunctata Mabille, 1900
Micraphe lateritia Karsch, 1896
Monopecta castanea Janse, 1964
Natada chrysaspis Hampson, 1910
Natada kochi Janse, 1964
Neogavara imitans Janse, 1964
Neomocena brunneocrossa Janse, 1964
Neomocena convergens (Hering, 1928)
Niphadolepis bipunctata Hering, 1929
Omocenoides isophanes Janse, 1964
Paraphlebs singularis Aurivillius, 1921
Parapluda invitabilis (Wallengren, 1860)
Parapluda neglecta (Hering, 1928)
Parasa chapmani Kirby, 1892
Probalintha inclusa Walker, 1865
Prodidactis mystica (Meyrick, 1918)
Pseudothosea albisignata Janse, 1964
Scotinocerides fasciata Hering, 1937
Scotinocerides pseudorestricta Hering, 1937
Scotinochroa diplothysana Tams, 1932
Scotinochroa inconsequens Butler, 1897
Scotinochroa rufescens Janse, 1964
Semyrilla lineata (Holland, 1893)
Sporetolepis platti Janse, 1964
Stroter capillatus Karsch, 1899
Stroter dukei Janse, 1964
Stroter intermissa (Walker, 1865)
Susicena pyrocausta (Hampson, 1910)
Taeda aetitis Wallengren, 1863
Taeda connexa (Janse, 1964)
Taeda gemmans (Felder, 1874)
Thosea platti West, 1937
Trachyptena holobrunnea (Janse, 1964)
Trogocrada deleter Tams, 1953
Trogocrada dimorpha Janse, 1964
Unipectiphora delosignata Janse, 1964
Zarachella specularis Jordan, 1915
Zinara discophora Hampson, 1910
Zinara nervosa Walker, 1869
Zorostola melanoxantha Janse, 1964

Family Lymantriidae
Aclonophlebia rhodea Hampson, 1905
Aroa anthora (Felder, 1874)
Aroa difficilis Walker, 1865
Aroa discalis Walker, 1855
Aroa melanoleuca Hampson, 1905
Bicelluphora argentea Janse, 1915

Bracharoa dregei (Herrich-Schäffer, 1854)
Bracharoa mixta (Snellen, 1872)
Bracharoa quadripunctata (Wallengren, 1875)
Bracharoa tricolor (Herrich-Schäffer, 1856)
Cimola opalina Walker, 1855
Creagra liturata (Guérin-Méneville, 1844)
Cropera phlebitis (Hampson, 1905)
Cropera sericea (Hampson, 1910)
Cropera stilpnaroma Hering, 1926
Cropera testacea Walker, 1855
Crorema adspersa (Herrich-Schäffer, 1854)
Crorema fulvinotata (Butler, 1893)
Crorema nigropunctata Collenette, 1931
Crorema setinoides (Holland, 1893)
Dasychira pennatula (Fabricius, 1793)
Dasychira polia Hering, 1926
Dasychira punctifera (Walker, 1857)
Dicranuropsis vilis Felder, 1874
Eudasychira georgiana (Fawcett, 1900)
Eudasychira metathermes (Hampson, 1905)
Eudasychira poliotis (Hampson, 1910)
Eudasychira proleprota (Hampson, 1905)
Euproctis aethiopica (Bethune-Baker, 1908)
Euproctis beato Bryk, 1934
Euproctis bicolor Janse, 1915
Euproctis chionea Collenette, 1956
Euproctis crocata (Boisduval, 1847)
Euproctis flavicincta Janse, 1915
Euproctis haemodetes Hampson, 1905
Euproctis hardenbergia (Janse, 1915)
Euproctis iridescens Janse, 1915
Euproctis melanura (Wallengren, 1860)
Euproctis nigripuncta Janse, 1915
Euproctis pallida (Kirby, 1896)
Euproctis petavia (Stoll, 1782)
Euproctis producta (Walker, 1863)
Euproctis punctifera (Walker, 1855)
Euproctis rufopunctata (Walker, 1862)
Euproctis sanguigutta Hampson, 1905
Euproctis squamosa (Walker, 1855)
Euproctis straminicolor Janse, 1915
Euproctis subalba (Janse, 1915)
Euproctis terminalis (Walker, 1854)
Euproctoides ertli (Wichgraf, 1922)
Hemerophanes diatoma (Hering, 1926)
Hemerophanes libyra (Druce, 1896)
Homochira rendalli (Distant, 1897)
Homoeomeria flavicapilla (Wallengren, 1860)
Homoeomeria nivea Aurivillius, 1909
Knappetra arenacea (Linnaeus, 1767)
Knappetra fasciata (Walker, 1855)
Lacipa bizonoides Butler, 1893
Lacipa distanti Dewitz, 1881
Lacipa florida (Swinhoe, 1903)
Lacipa gemmata Distant, 1897
Lacipa nobilis (Herrich-Schäffer, 1855)
Lacipa picta (Boisduval, 1847)
Lacipa pulverea Distant, 1898
Lacipa quadripunctata Dewitz, 1881
Lacipa sarcistis Hampson, 1905
Lacipa sexpunctata Distant, 1897
Laelia albimaculata (Hering, 1926)
Laelia amata (Hering, 1926)
Laelia amaura Hering, 1926
Laelia angustipennis (Walker, 1855)
Laelia aurea Janse, 1915
Laelia aurivillii (Hering, 1926)
Laelia basifurca (Walker, 1865)
Laelia batoides Plötz, 1880
Laelia bifascia Hampson, 1905
Laelia bonaberiensis (Strand, 1915)
Laelia bryophilina (Hampson, 1910)
Laelia clarki Janse, 1915
Laelia confinis (Distant, 1899)
Laelia curvivirgata Karsch, 1895
Laelia danva (Schaus & Clements, 1893)
Laelia diascia Hampson, 1905
Laelia ecscota (Hampson, 1905)
Laelia esthlopis (Collenette, 1953)
Laelia extatura (Distant, 1897)
Laelia extorta (Distant, 1897)
Laelia figlina Distant, 1899
Laelia fracta Schaus & Clements, 1893
Laelia fusca (Walker, 1855)
Laelia gephyra (Hering, 1926)
Laelia haematica Hampson, 1905
Laelia hampsoni (Hering, 1926)
Laelia herbida (Walker, 1856)
Laelia hughesi (Collenette, 1933)
Laelia janenschi Hering, 1926
Laelia lavia Swinhoe, 1903
Laelia lunensis (Hampson, 1905)
Laelia mediofasciata (Hering, 1926)
Laelia melaxantha (Walker, 1865)
Laelia municipalis Distant, 1897
Laelia nigripulverea Janse, 1915
Laelia nubifuga (Holland, 1893)
Laelia octophora (Hampson, 1905)
Laelia phenax (Collenette, 1932)
Laelia pluto (Hering, 1926)
Laelia postpura (Hampson, 1905)
Laelia pulcherrima (Hering, 1926)
Laelia punctulata (Butler, 1875)
Laelia pyrosoma (Hampson, 1910)
Laelia robusta Janse, 1915
Laelia rocana (Swinhoe, 1906)
Laelia rosea Schaus & Clements, 1893
Laelia subrosea (Walker, 1855)
Laelia subviridis Janse, 1915
Laelia swinnyi Janse, 1915
Laelia thanatos (Hering, 1926)
Laelia xyleutis Hampson, 1905
Lepidopalpus hyalina Janse, 1915
Leptaroa paupera Hering, 1926
Leucoma monosticta (Butler, 1898)
Leucoma ogovensis (Holland, 1893)
Leucoma parva (Plötz, 1880)
Lymantria disparina (Hering, 1926)
Lymantria kettlewelli Collenette, 1953
Lymantria tacita Hering, 1927
Marblepsis flabellaria (Fabricius, 1787)
Marblepsis melanocraspis (Hampson, 1905)
Micraroa minima Janse, 1915
Micraroa rufescens Hampson, 1905
Morasa modesta Walker, 1855
Naroma varipes (Walker, 1865)
Ogoa simplex Walker, 1856
Olapa fulviceps Hampson, 1910
Olapa furva Hampson, 1905
Olapa nigricosta Hampson, 1905
Olapa nuda Holland, 1893
Olene basalis (Walker, 1855)
Palasea albimacula Wallengren, 1863
Paqueta chloroscia (Hering, 1926)
Paraproctis chionopeza Collenette, 1954
Penthophera lutea (Boisduval, 1847)
Penthophera subfusca (Boisduval, 1847)
Pirga pellucida Wichgraf, 1922
Pirga transvalensis Janse, 1915
Polymona rufifemur Walker, 1855
Psalis africana Kiriakoff, 1956
Psalis securis Hübner, 1823
Pseudobazisa perculta (Distant, 1897)
Pseudobazisa sericea (Hampson, 1910)
Pteredoa monosticta (Butler, 1898)
Pteredoa plumosa Hampson, 1905
Pteredoa usebia (Swinhoe, 1903)
Repena fusca Walker, 1856
Rhypopteryx diplogramma Hering, 1927
Rhypopteryx hemichrysa Collenette, 1960
Rhypopteryx lugardi (Swinhoe, 1903)
Rhypopteryx rhodalipha (Felder, 1874)
Rhypopteryx rhodea (Hampson, 1905
Rhypopteryx rubripunctata (Weymer, 1892)
Ruanda furva (Hampson, 1905)
Ruanda nuda (Holland, 1897)
Schalidomitra ambages Strand, 1911
Stracena bananae (Butler, 1897)
Stracena tavetensis (Holland, 1892)
Stracena telesilla (Druce, 1899)
Tearosoma aspersum Felder, 1874

Family Lyonetiidae
Chrysolytis deliarcha Meyrick, 1937
Copobathra menodora Meyrick, 1911
Crobylophora daricella Meyrick, 1881
Crobylophora metallifera (Walsingham, 1891)
Crobylophora xanthochyta Meyrick, 1918
Cycloponympha julia Meyrick, 1913
Cycloponympha perspicua Meyrick, 1913
Leucoptera autograpta Meyrick, 1918
Leucoptera clerodendrella Vári, 1955
Leucoptera loxaula Meyrick, 1928
Leucoptera meyricki Ghesquière, 1940
Leucoptera obelacma Meyrick, 1918
Leucoptera parinaricola Vári, 1955
Leucoptera pulchricola Vári, 1955
Leucoptera scammatias Meyrick, 1909
Lyonetia cotifraga Meyrick, 1909
Phyllobrostis apathetica (Meyrick, 1921)
Phyllobrostis argillosa Meyrick, 1911
Phyllobrostis calcaria Meyrick, 1911
Pilotocoma tephroleuca Meyrick, 1913

Family Metarbelidae
Arbelodes agassizi Lehmann, 2010
Arbelodes albitorquata (Hampson, 1910)
Arbelodes collaris Aurivillius, 1921
Arbelodes deprinsi Lehmann, 2010
Arbelodes dicksoni Lehmann, 2010
Arbelodes flavicolor (Janse, 1925)
Arbelodes franziskae Lehmann, 2010
Arbelodes griseata (Janse, 1925)
Arbelodes haberlandorum Lehmann, 2010
Arbelodes iridescens (Janse, 1925)
Arbelodes kruegeri Lehmann, 2010
Arbelodes meridialis Karsch, 1896
Arbelodes mondeensis Lehmann, 2010
Arbelodes sebelensis Lehmann, 2010
Arbelodes shimonii Lehmann, 2010
Arbelodes sticticosta (Hampson, 1910)
Arbelodes varii Lehmann, 2010
Indarbela tegula (Distant, 1897)
Kroonia natalica (Hampson, 1910)
Lebedodes castanea Janse, 1925
Lebedodes reticulata Gaede, 1929
Lebedodes rufithorax Hampson, 1910
Lebedodes wichgrafi (Grünberg, 1910)
Marshalliana jansei Gaede, 1929
Metarbela costistrigata Hampson, 1920
Metarbela cymaphora Hampson, 1910
Metarbela dialeuca Hampson, 1910
Metarbela tuckeri (Butler, 1875)
Ortharbela albivenata (Hampson, 1910)
Paralebedella carnescens (Hampson, 1910)
Salagena obsolescens Hampson, 1910
Salagena reticulata Janse, 1925
Salagena tessellata Distant, 1897
Salagena transversa Walker, 1865
Teragra althodes Hampson, 1920
Teragra conspersa Walker, 1855
Teragra guttifera Hampson, 1910
Teragra irvingi Janse, 1925
Teragra vogti Bethune-Baker, 1927

Family Micropterigidae
Agrionympha capensis Whalley, 1978
Agrionympha fuscoapicella Gibbs, 2011
Agrionympha jansella Gibbs, 2011
Agrionympha karoo Gibbs, 2011
Agrionympha kroonella Gibbs, 2011
Agrionympha pseliacma Meyrick, 1921
Agrionympha pseudovari Gibbs, 2011
Agrionympha sagitella Gibbs, 2011
Agrionympha vari Whalley, 1978

Family Nepticulidae
About 118 species - see: List of moths of South Africa (Nepticulidae)

Family Noctuidae
About 1,323 species - see: List of moths of South Africa (Noctuidae)

Family Nolidae
Acripia chloropera Hampson, 1902
Acripia leprosa (Felder & Rogenhofer, 1874)
Acripia scapularis (Felder & Rogenhofer, 1874)
Acripia semiviridis Hampson, 1902
Acripia subolivacea Walker, 1863
Aiteta veluta Hampson, 1912
Arcyophora elegantula Grünberg, 1910
Arcyophora longivalvis Guenée, 1852
Arcyophora nudipes Wallengren, 1856
Blenina albifascia Pinhey, 1968
Blenina diagona Hampson, 1912
Blenina squamifera (Wallengren, 1860)
Bryophilopsis curvifera Hampson, 1912
Bryophilopsis tarachoides Mabille, 1900
Bryothripa miophaea Hampson, 1912
Characoma melanographa Hampson, 1918
Characoma miophora Hampson, 1912
Characoma nigricollaris Hampson, 1918
Characoma stictigrapta Hampson, 1914
Characoma submediana Wiltshire, 1986
Cremopalpus inquirendus Strand, 1909
Cryptothripa polyhymnia (Hampson, 1902)
Earias biplaga Walker, 1866
Earias cupreoviridis (Walker, 1862)
Earias insulana (Boisduval, 1833)
Gigantoceras rectilinea Hampson, 1912
Goniocalpe heteromorpha Hampson, 1920
Goniocalpe sericealis (Hampson, 1902)
Labanda bryochlora Hampson, 1902
Leocyma appollinis Guenée, 1852
Leocyma discophora Hampson, 1912
Lophocrama phoenicochlora Hampson, 1912
Maurilia arcuata (Walker, [1858])
Meganola infuscata (Hampson, 1903)
Meganola lucia (van Son, 1933)
Meganola subalbalis (Zeller, 1852)
Metanola gladstonei van Son, 1933
Metanola myriostigma van Son, 1933
Neaxestis acutangula Hampson, 1902
Neaxestis rhoda Hampson, 1905
Negeta luminosa (Walker, 1858)
Negeta ruficeps (Hampson, 1902)
Nola argyrolepis Hampson, 1907
Nola barbertonensis (van Son, 1933)
Nola bicincta Hampson, 1905
Nola holoscota Hampson, 1920
Nola imitata (van Son, 1933)
Nola internella (Walker, 1865)
Nola iridescens (van Son, 1933)
Nola leucalea Hampson, 1907
Nola major Hampson, 1891
Nola melanoscelis (Hampson, 1914)
Nola meridionalis Wallengren, 1875
Nola mesoscota Hampson, 1909
Nola monofascia van Son, 1933
Nola patricia van Son, 1933
Nola phaeocraspis (Hampson, 1909)
Nola poliotis Hampson, 1907
Nola praefica Saalmüller, 1884
Nola sarniensis (van Son, 1933)
Nola socotrensis (Hampson, 1901)
Nola squalida Staudinger, 1870
Nola steniphona van Son, 1933
Nola swierstrai van Son, 1933
Nola taeniata Snellen, 1874
Nola tineoides (Walker, [1858])
Nola transitoria van Son, 1933
Nolidia carolinae van Son, 1933
Nolidia unipuncta van Son, 1933
Nycteola malachitis (Hampson, 1912)
Oedicraspis subfervida Hampson, 1912
Paranola bipartita van Son, 1933
Paranola nigristriga van Son, 1933
Paraxestis rufescens Hampson, 1902
Pardasena atripuncta Hampson, 1912
Pardasena minorella Walker, 1866
Pardasena punctata Hampson, 1902
Pardasena virgulana (Mabille, 1880)
Pardoxia graellsii (Feisthamel, 1837)
Periplusia cinerascens Holland, 1894
Poecilonola littoralis van Son, 1933
Risoba obstructa Moore, 1881
Risoba sticticraspis Hampson, 1912
Selepa docilis Butler, 1881
Selepa leucogonia (Hampson, 1905)
Selepa rufescens Hampson, 1912
Selepa transvalica Hampson, 1912
Vandamia lightfooti van Son, 1933
Vandamia mariepi van Son, 1933
Vandamia typica van Son, 1933
Westermannia araeogramma Hampson, 1905
Westermannia argyroplaga Hampson, 1905
Westermannia convergens Hampson, 1902
Westermannia roseitincta Pinhey, 1968
Westermannia superba Hübner, 1823
Xanthodes albago (Fabricius, 1794)

Family Notodontidae
Acrasiella curvilinea (Swinhoe, 1907)
Adrallia bipunctata Walker, 1865
Afrogluphisia demas Kiriakoff, 1970
Afroplitis dasychirina (Gaede, 1928)
Afroplitis phyllocampa (Trimen, 1909)
Amphiphalera nigripuncta Kiriakoff, 1975
Amyops ingens Karsch, 1895
Anaphe panda (Boisduval, 1847)
Anaphe reticulata Walker, 1855
Antheua anodonta (Hampson, 1910)
Antheua aurifodinae (Distant, 1902)
Antheua consanguinea Distant, 1903
Antheua croceipuncta Hampson, 1910
Antheua delicata Bethune-Baker, 1911
Antheua dimorpha Janse, 1920
Antheua extenuata Walker, 1869
Antheua insignata Gaede, 1928
Antheua mixta Janse, 1920
Antheua ornata (Walker, 1865)
Antheua simplex Walker, 1855
Antheua tricolor Walker, 1855
Antheua woerdeni (Snellen, 1872)
Antheuella flavida (Hampson, 1910)
Antheuella incana (Janse, 1920)
Anticleapa varii Kiriakoff, 1970
Archistilbia varii Kiriakoff, 1970
Arciera phragmatoecioides (Rothschild, 1917)
Atrasana nigrosignata Kiriakoff, 1975
Atrasana postica Walker, 1856
Atrasana rectilinea (Gaede, 1928)
Atrasana uncifera (Hampson, 1910)
Batempa plana Kiriakoff, 1962
Bilulua strigata Kiriakoff, 1954
Bisolita rubrifascia (Hampson, 1910)
Bisolita strigata (Aurivillius, 1906)
Catastygne tristicolor (Gaede, 1928)
Catochria catocaloides Herrich-Schäffer, 1855
Catochria postflava Kiriakoff, 1955
Cerurella natalensis Kiriakoff, 1962
Chlorocalliope calliope (Hampson, 1910)
Chlorocalliope subvernalis Kiriakoff, 1958
Chlorochadisra viridipulverea (Gaede, 1928)
Clostera lentisignata (Hampson, 1910)
Clostera limacodina Kühne, 2010
Clostera roseotincta (Janse, 1920)
Clostera violacearia (Janse, 1920)
Clostera vumba Kiriakoff, 1981
Crambometra derelicta Prout, 1915
Crambometra gladstonei (Janse, 1920)
Crambometra vandenbergae Kiriakoff, 1981
Dasychirella cinderella Kiriakoff, 1970
Deinarchia agramma (Hampson, 1910)
Desmeocraera atribasalis (Hampson, 1910)
Desmeocraera basalis Distant, 1899
Desmeocraera congoana Aurivillius, 1900
Desmeocraera dorsalis Kiriakoff, 1981
Desmeocraera griseiviridis (Hampson, 1910)
Desmeocraera interpellatrix (Wallengren, 1860)
Desmeocraera jansei Kiriakoff, 1958
Desmeocraera latex (Druce, 1901)
Desmeocraera nugatrix Felder, 1874
Desmeocraera octoginta (Hampson, 1910)
Desmeocraera platti Janse, 1920
Desmeocraera tripuncta Janse, 1920
Desmeocraera uniformis Gaede, 1928
Desmeocraera vernalis Distant, 1897
Desmeocraera zombae Kiriakoff, 1958
Disracha persimilis (Hampson, 1910)
Elaphrodes duplex (Gaede, 1928)
Epanaphe clarilla Aurivillius, 1904
Epicerulella imitans Kiriakoff, 1981
Epicerura pergrisea (Hampson, 1910)
Epicerura steniptera (Hampson, 1910)
Epidonta brunneomixta (Mabille, 1897)
Euanthia venosa Kiriakoff, 1962
Eubreyeria dasychiroides (Janse, 1920)
Eurystaura brunnea Janse, 1920
Eurystaura griseitincta (Hampson, 1910)
Eurystauridia medialis (Gaede, 1928)
Eurystauridia triangularis (Gaede, 1928)
Eutimia marpissa Wallengren, 1858
Graphodonta fulva (Kiriakoff, 1962)
Hampsonita esmeralda (Hampson, 1910)
Haplozana nigrolineata Aurivillius, 1901
Iostaura jansei Kiriakoff, 1970
Iridoplitis iridescens Kiriakoff, 1955
Janthinisca badia Kiriakoff, 1979
Janthinisca linda Kiriakoff, 1979
Jozinia leonina Kiriakoff, 1970
Lopiena decorata Kiriakoff, 1975
Metascrancia jansei Kiriakoff, 1970
Metopteryx cinerea (Janse, 1920)
Metopteryx rattus (Kiriakoff, 1970)
Notocerura spiritalis (Distant, 1899)
Notoxantha sesamiodes Hampson, 1910
Odontoperas heterogyna (Hampson, 1910)
Odontoperas obliqualinea (Bethune-Baker, 1911)
Odontoperas rosacea Kiriakoff, 1959
Paradiastema pulverea Hampson, 1910
Pararethona hierax (Distant, 1897)
Peratodonta gypsitea (Kiriakoff, 1968)
Phalera imitata Druce, 1896
Phalera lignitea Mabille, 1900
Phalera lydenburgi Distant, 1899
Phycitimorpha stigmatica Janse, 1920
Phyllaliodes agramma Hampson, 1910
Phyllaliodes poliostrota (Hampson, 1910)
Polelassothys plumitarsus Janse, 1920
Polienus capillata (Wallengren, 1875)
Polienus fuscatus Janse, 1920
Polienus rubritincta (Hampson, 1910)
Psalisodes defasciata Gaede, 1928
Pseudorethona albicans (Walker, 1855)
Pseudoscrancia africana (Holland, 1893)
Quista cinereomixta Kiriakoff, 1959
Rasemia dasychira (Hampson, 1910)
Rasemia euzopherodes (Hampson, 1910)
Rasemia macrodonta (Hampson, 1909)
Rhenea mediata (Walker, 1865)
Rhenea rufescens Kiriakoff, 1954
Riebeeckia whittakeri Kiriakoff, 1981
Rosinella rosinaria (Hampson, 1910)
Sarimarais bicolor (Distant, 1899)
Sarimarais peringueyi (Janse, 1920)
Sarimarais quarta Kiriakoff, 1962
Scalmicauda oneili Janse, 1920
Scalmicauda tessmanni (Strand, 1911)
Scrancia atrifrons Hampson, 1910
Scrancia brunnescens Gaede, 1928
Scrancia discomma Jordan, 1916
Scrancia elanus Kiriakoff, 1971
Scrancia galactoperoides Kiriakoff, 1970
Scrancia milvus Kiriakoff, 1971
Scrancia stictica Hampson, 1910
Simesia dasychiroides (Butler, 1898)
Stemmatophalera semiflava (Hampson, 1910)
Stenostaura impeditus (Walker, 1865)
Stenostaura minutissima Kiriakoff, 1970
Stenostaura subtilis Kiriakoff, 1970
Stenostaura varians (Kiriakoff, 1962)
Subscrancia albobrunnea Kiriakoff, 1970
Subscrancia nigra (Aurivillius, 1904)
Synete olivaceofusca (Rothschild, 1917)
Thaumetopoea apologetica Strand, 1909
Trotonotus bettoni Butler, 1898

Family Oecophoridae
Aeoloscelis tripoda Meyrick, 1913
Agroecodes comata Meyrick, 1937
Alabonia coarctata (Walsingham, 1881)
Amphipseustis disputanda Meyrick, 1921
Anchinia furculata Meyrick, 1924
Anchinia oenochares Meyrick, 1924
Antaeotricha ovata Walsingham, 1881
Areocosma orsobela Meyrick, 1917
Aulotropha pentasticta Meyrick, 1918
Batia decurrens (Meyrick, 1918)
Borkhausenia intumescens Meyrick, 1921
Briarostoma pyrrhopsamma Meyrick, 1920
Ceranthes apellodora Meyrick, 1926
Ceranthes syncrotaula Meyrick, 1926
Ceranthes thiota Meyrick, 1918
Chalcorectis argoplecta Meyrick, 1937
Choronoma isoxysta Meyrick, 1926
Coesyra balantias Meyrick, 1908
Coesyra campylotis Meyrick, 1914
Coesyra centrobola Meyrick, 1914
Coesyra rutila Meyrick, 1912
Crystallogenes chalcoschista Meyrick, 1937
Diocosma callichroa Meyrick, 1909
Diocosma ceramopis Meyrick, 1909
Diocosma eotrocha Meyrick, 1918
Diocosma molybdela Meyrick, 1917
Diocosma obliquestrigella (Walsingham, 1881)
Diocosma tricycla Meyrick, 1909
Diocosma zarifa Meyrick, 1921
Doxomeres diaxantha Meyrick, 1917
Endrosis psammodora Meyrick, 1921
Endrosis sarcitrella (Linnaeus, 1758)
Epiphractis aulica Meyrick, 1912
Epiphractis crocoplecta Meyrick, 1913
Epiphractis imbellis Meyrick, 1914
Epiphractis rubricata Meyrick, 1913
Epiphractis sarcopa (Meyrick, 1909)
Epiphractis thysanarcha Meyrick, 1918
Eucleodora chalybeella Walsingham, 1881
Eucleodora ingrata Meyrick, 1913
Eulechria phaeopsamma Meyrick, 1913
Harpella scolopistis Meyrick, 1909
Hednophora pyritis Meyrick, 1911
Heterozyga gyrospila Meyrick, 1918
Hypercallia haematella Felder, 1875
Hypercallia sincera Meyrick, 1909
Hypercallia subreticulata Walsingham, 1881
Isocrita eremasta Meyrick, 1914
Isocrita ithydoxa Meyrick, 1920
Isocrita protophanes Meyrick, 1927
Isocrita psalactis Meyrick, 1912
Isocrita stolarcha Meyrick, 1909
Meloteles xanthodoxa Meyrick, 1920
Metachanda citrodesma (Meyrick, 1911)
Metachanda oxyacma Meyrick, 1928
Metachanda trimetopa Meyrick, 1937
Ocystola proxena Meyrick, 1914
Oedematopoda illucens (Meyrick, 1914)
Oedematopoda princeps (Zeller, 1852)
Opsigenes parastacta Meyrick, 1918
Oxyscopa dealbata Meyrick, 1926
Pachyrhabda triplecta Meyrick, 1913
Pachyrhabda unctoria Meyrick, 1911
Parapleuris oxycrena Meyrick, 1937
Philametris aethalopa Meyrick, 1924
Philobota chalinitis Meyrick, 1909
Philobota dryinota Meyrick, 1914
Philobota erastis Meyrick, 1910
Philobota tectifera Meyrick, 1909
Philobota virgo Walsingham, 1891
Phratriodes curvisignis Meyrick, 1926
Picrogenes bactrospila Meyrick, 1917
Plesiosticha acida (Meyrick, 1911)
Plesiosticha endocentra (Meyrick, 1914)
Plesiosticha galactaea (Meyrick, 1908)
Pleurota drucella (Walsingham, 1881)
Promalactis geometrica Meyrick, 1913
Promalactis recurva Meyrick, 1914
Promalactis scalmotoma Meyrick, 1918
Promalactis sphaerograpta Meyrick, 1937
Promalactis veridica Meyrick, 1913
Protomacha conservata Meyrick, 1918
Protomacha sosigona Meyrick, 1920
Rhoecoptera gigas (Walsingham, 1891)
Saropla dryozona Meyrick, 1913
Schiffermuelleria helminthias Meyrick, 1918
Schiffermuelleria pedicata Meyrick, 1918
Selidoris deligata (Meyrick, 1921)
Stathmopoda arcata Meyrick, 1913
Stathmopoda auriferella (Walker, 1864)
Stathmopoda autoxantha Meyrick, 1913
Stathmopoda citrinopis Meyrick, 1927
Stathmopoda crassella Walsingham, 1891
Stathmopoda ficivora Kasy, 1973
Stathmopoda glyceropa Meyrick, 1915
Stathmopoda hemiplecta Meyrick, 1921
Stathmopoda luminata Meyrick, 1911
Stathmopoda lychnacma (Meyrick, 1927)
Stathmopoda maculata Walsingham, 1891
Stathmopoda pomifera Meyrick, 1913
Stathmopoda trichodora (Meyrick, 1909)
Stathmopoda xanthoplitis Meyrick, 1908
Tanyzancla diorycta Meyrick, 1920
Tanyzancla semistricta Meyrick, 1920
Teratopsis tunicella Walsingham, 1881
Thamnocrana haemorrhoa Meyrick, 1927
Thyestarcha acrogypsa Meyrick, 1917
Thyestarcha edax Meyrick, 1912

Family Opostegidae
Opostega amphimitra Meyrick, 1913
Opostega cirrhacma Meyrick, 1911
Opostega diplardis Meyrick, 1921
Opostega granifera Meyrick, 1913
Opostega idiocoma Meyrick, 1918
Opostega melitardis Meyrick, 1918
Opostega pelocrossa Meyrick, 1928
Opostega phaeosoma Meyrick, 1928
Opostega praefusca Meyrick, 1913
Opostega radiosa Meyrick, 1913
Opostega symbolica Meyrick, 1914
Opostega tincta Meyrick, 1918
Pseudopostega bellicosa (Meyrick, 1911)
Pseudopostega clastozona (Meyrick, 1913)

Family Plutellidae
Gypsosaris coniata Meyrick, 1909
Lepocnemis bascanopa Meyrick, 1913
Plutella balanopis Meyrick, 1909
Plutella xylostella (Linnaeus, 1758)

Family Prodoxidae
Lampronia albifusa Meyrick, 1926
Sindonophora leucozona Meyrick, 1917

Family Prototheoridae
Prototheora biserrata Davis, 1996
Prototheora cooperi Janse, 1942
Prototheora corvifera (Meyrick, 1920)
Prototheora drackensbergae Davis, 1996
Prototheora geniculata Davis, 1996
Prototheora merga Davis, 1996
Prototheora monoglossa Meyrick, 1924
Prototheora parachlora (Meyrick, 1919)
Prototheora petrosema Meyrick, 1917
Prototheora quadricornis Meyrick, 1920
Prototheora serruligera Meyrick, 1920

Family Psychidae
Acanthopsyche roomei Bourgogne, 1984
Acanthopsyche tristis Janse, 1917
Amydria poliodes Meyrick, 1909
Australoplacodoma bicolorata Sobczyk & Mey, 2007
Bacotia trimenii (Heylaerts, 1891)
Bambalina africa Bourgogne, 1984
Barbaroscardia metaclina Meyrick, 1920
Bythogenes atechna Meyrick, 1937
Cathalistis orinephela Meyrick, 1917
Commotrias eucolapta Meyrick, 1924
Cryptothelea zelleri (Heylaerts, 1884)
Ctenocompa famula Meyrick, 1920
Ctenocompa perlucescens Meyrick, 1927
Ctenocompa vafra Meyrick, 1921
Ctenocompa zascia Meyrick, 1920
Deborreides febrettina (Bourgogne, 1965)
Diaphanopsyche rogenhoferi (Heylaerts, 1890)
Dissoctena affinis Walsingham, 1891
Epaleura salaria Meyrick, 1917
Epichnopterix transvalica Hampson, 1910
Eumeta cervina Druce, 1887
Eumeta hardenbergeri Bourgogne, 1955
Eumeta zelleri Heylaerts, 1884
Fallacipsyche adelpha Bourgogne, 1977
Gymnelema discerpta Meyrick, 1924
Gymnelema holopercna Meyrick, 1924
Gymnelema leucopasta Hampson, 1910
Gymnelema pelverulenta Hampson, 1910
Gymnelema plebigena Meyrick, 1924
Gymnelema stibarodes (Meyrick, 1909)
Gymnelema stygialis Hampson, 1910
Gymnelema vinctus (Walker, 1865)
Janseides subhyalina (Janse, 1917)
Kotochalia junodi (Heylaerts, 1890)
Lasioctena sisyraea Meyrick, 1887
Lytrophila humida Meyrick, 1913
Lytrophila ingeminata Meyrick, 1914
Lytrophila panarga Meyrick, 1913
Lytrophila phaulopa Meyrick, 1921
Lytrophila sporarcha Meyrick, 1921
Mallobathra zophaula Meyrick, 1920
Melasina hippias Meyrick, 1921
Melasina lanyphaea Meyrick, 1924
Melasina nigra Meyrick, 1910
Mesopherna incultella (Walker, 1864)
Metisa aethiops (Hampson, 1910)
Metisa heylaertsi (Junod, 1898)
Metisa jansei Bourgogne, 1973
Monda bicolor Strand, 1911
Monda delicatissima Walker, 1865
Narycia antibatis Meyrick, 1926
Narycia centropa Meyrick, 1922
Narycia isoxantha Meyrick, 1920
Narycia prothyrodes Meyrick, 1921
Narycia saccharata (Meyrick, 1914)
Narycia transvaalicola Strand, 1929
Oiketicoides maledicta (Scheben, 1910)
Penestoglossa capensis Felder & Rogenhofer, 1875
Picrospora achlyota (Meyrick, 1926)
Picrospora amalthea (Meyrick, 1937)
Picrospora anastrota Meyrick, 1912
Picrospora araea Meyrick, 1912
Picrospora chrysochalca (Meyrick, 1926)
Picrospora coniographa (Meyrick, 1928)
Picrospora crocostacta (Meyrick, 1912)
Picrospora frigens (Meyrick, 1921)
Picrospora furcifera (Meyrick, 1920)
Picrospora inops (Meyrick, 1921)
Picrospora isometra (Meyrick, 1926)
Picrospora lithacopa Meyrick, 1920
Picrospora medicata (Meyrick, 1914)
Picrospora ochrophragma (Meyrick, 1920)
Picrospora protocentra Meyrick, 1921
Picrospora purgata Meyrick, 1913
Picrospora secura (Meyrick, 1912)
Picrospora selmatarcha (Meyrick, 1921)
Placodoma fulva Sobczyk & Mey, 2007
Pseudometisa alba (Janse, 1917)
Psyche fatalis Meyrick, 1926
Psyche luticoma (Meyrick, 1918)
Psyche obscurata Meyrick, 1917
Psyche ominosa (Meyrick, 1918)
Psyche pinicola Meyrick, 1937
Sapheneutis certificata Meyrick, 1918
Sapheneutis galactodes Meyrick, 1915
Sapheneutis thlipsias Meyrick, 1915
Sclerophricta tyreuta Meyrick, 1918
Sematocera fuliginipuncta Durrant, 1892
Taleporia discussa Meyrick, 1921
Taleporia mesochlora Meyrick, 1918
Taleporia sciacta Meyrick, 1921
Thranitica hemicopa Meyrick, 1908
Trichocossus albiguttata Hampson, 1910
Trichocossus arvensis Janse, 1917
Typhonia abacodes (Meyrick, 1908)
Typhonia amica (Meyrick, 1908)
Typhonia animosa (Meyrick, 1913)
Typhonia bettoni (Butler, 1898)
Typhonia circophora (Meyrick, 1909)
Typhonia cnaphalodes (Meyrick, 1917)
Typhonia craterodes (Meyrick, 1917)
Typhonia cylindraula (Meyrick, 1920)
Typhonia dissoluta (Meyrick, 1908)
Typhonia effervescens (Meyrick, 1911)
Typhonia gypsopetra (Meyrick, 1937)
Typhonia halieutis (Meyrick, 1908)
Typhonia homopercna (Meyrick, 1920)
Typhonia indigena (Meyrick, 1917)
Typhonia interscissa (Meyrick, 1924)
Typhonia inveterata (Meyrick, 1915)
Typhonia linodyta (Meyrick, 1921)
Typhonia liochra (Meyrick, 1908)
Typhonia marmarodes (Meyrick, 1920)
Typhonia mylica (Meyrick, 1908)
Typhonia nectaritis (Meyrick, 1915)
Typhonia nigrescens (Meyrick, 1920)
Typhonia paraphrictis (Meyrick, 1908)
Typhonia pelostrota (Meyrick, 1927)
Typhonia petrodes (Meyrick, 1914)
Typhonia picea (Meyrick, 1917)
Typhonia salicoma (Meyrick, 1918)
Typhonia stelitis (Meyrick, 1908)
Typhonia stupea (Wallengren, 1875)
Typhonia susurrans (Meyrick, 1911)
Typhonia systolaea (Meyrick, 1908)
Typhonia talaria (Meyrick, 1924)
Typhonia tanyphaea (Meyrick, 1924)
Typhonia tyrophanes (Meyrick, 1917)
Zelomora phlyctidota Meyrick, 1920

Family Pterophoridae
Adaina gentilis Meyrick, 1911
Adaina periarga Meyrick, 1913
Agdistis africana Arenberger, 1996
Agdistis arenbergeri Gielis, 1986
Agdistis clara Arenberger, 1986
Agdistis cretifera Meyrick, 1909
Agdistis criocephala Meyrick, 1909
Agdistis darwini Arenberger, 2009
Agdistis dentalis Arenberger, 1986
Agdistis dicksoni Kovtunovich & Ustjuzhanin, 2009
Agdistis dimetra Meyrick, 1924
Agdistis eberti Arenberger, 2009
Agdistis endrodyi Kovtunovich & Ustjuzhanin, 2009
Agdistis furcata Arenberger, 1996
Agdistis gibberipennis Arenberger, 1996
Agdistis infumata Meyrick, 1912
Agdistis jansei Kovtunovich & Ustjuzhanin, 2009
Agdistis karischi Arenberger, 1996
Agdistis krooni Kovtunovich & Ustjuzhanin, 2009
Agdistis kruegeri Kovtunovich & Ustjuzhanin, 2009
Agdistis lomholdti Gielis, 1990
Agdistis malitiosa Meyrick, 1909
Agdistis malleana Arenberger, 1988
Agdistis meyi Arenberger, 2008
Agdistis obstinata Meyrick, 1920
Agdistis piccolo Arenberger, 1986
Agdistis potgieteri Kovtunovich & Ustjuzhanin, 2009
Agdistis pustulalis Walker, 1864
Agdistis quagga Arenberger, 2009
Agdistis reciprocans Meyrick, 1924
Agdistis spinosa Arenberger, 1986
Agdistis tamaricis (Zeller, 1847)
Agdistis tsumkwe Arenberger, 2001
Agdistis unguica Arenberger, 1986
Agdistis varii Kovtunovich & Ustjuzhanin, 2009
Amblyptilia direptalis (Walker, 1864)
Apoxyptilus anthites (Meyrick, 1936)
Arcoptilia pongola Ustjuzhanin & Kovtunovich, 2010
Buckleria vanderwolfi Gielis, 2008
Cosmoclostis brachybela T. B. Fletcher, 1947
Eucapperia bullifera (Meyrick, 1918)
Exelastis atomosa (Walsingham, 1885)
Exelastis crepuscularis (Meyrick, 1909)
Exelastis pavidus (Meyrick, 1889)
Exelastis tenax (Meyrick, 1913)
Gypsochares aulotes (Meyrick, 1911)
Gypsochares catharotes (Meyrick, 1908)
Gypsochares londti Ustjuzhanin & Kovtunovich, 2010
Hellinsia acuminatus (Meyrick, 1920)
Hellinsia adumbratus (Walsingham, 1881)
Hellinsia ammonias (Meyrick, 1909)
Hellinsia callidus (Meyrick, 1913)
Hellinsia colubratus (Meyrick, 1909)
Hellinsia furfurosus (Meyrick, 1911)
Hellinsia illutus (Meyrick, 1917)
Hellinsia invidiosus (Meyrick, 1911)
Hellinsia lienigianus (Zeller, 1852)
Hellinsia pacifica (Meyrick, 1911)
Hellinsia purus (Meyrick, 1913)
Hellinsia serpens (Meyrick, 1909)
Hellinsia sordidatus (Meyrick, 1912)
Hellinsia sphenites (Meyrick, 1913)
Hellinsia timidus (Meyrick, 1908)
Hellinsia tripunctatus (Walsingham, 1881)
Hepalastis pumilio (Zeller, 1873)
Macrotinactis stenodactylus (T. B. Fletcher, 1911)
Marasmarcha bonaespei (Walsingham, 1881)
Marasmarcha verax (Meyrick, 1909)
Megalorhipida leptomeres (Meyrick, 1886)
Megalorhipida leucodactylus (Fabricius, 1794)
Oxyptilus erythrodactylus T. B. Fletcher, 1911
Oxyptilus variegatus Meyrick, 1920
Oxyptilus vibrans Meyrick, 1921
Picardia orchatias (Meyrick, 1908)
Platyptilia amphiloga Meyrick, 1909
Platyptilia barbarae Ustjuzhanin & Kovtunovich, 2010
Platyptilia corniculata Meyrick, 1913
Platyptilia empedota Meyrick, 1908
Platyptilia maligna Meyrick, 1913
Platyptilia molopias Meyrick, 1906
Platyptilia odiosa Meyrick, 1924
Platyptilia patriarcha Meyrick, 1912
Platyptilia periacta Meyrick, 1910
Platyptilia sabius (Felder & Rogenhofer, 1875)
Pselnophorus astragalotes Meyrick, 1909
Pselnophorus pachyceros Meyrick, 1921
Pselnophorus zulu Ustjuzhanin & Kovtunovich, 2010
Pseudoxyptilus secutor (Meyrick, 1911)
Pterophorus africanus Ustjuzhanin & Kovtunovich, 2010
Pterophorus albidus (Zeller, 1852)
Pterophorus candidalis (Walker, 1864)
Pterophorus dallastai Gielis, 1991
Pterophorus ischnodactyla (Treitschke, 1833)
Pterophorus rhyparias (Meyrick, 1908)
Sphenarches anisodactylus (Walker, 1864)
Sphenarches caffer (Zeller, 1851)
Stenodacma richardi Ustjuzhanin & Kovtunovich, 2010
Stenodacma wahlbergi (Zeller, 1852)
Stenoptilia johnistella Ustjuzhanin & Kovtunovich, 2010
Stenoptilia longalis (Walker, 1864)
Stenoptilia natalensis Ustjuzhanin & Kovtunovich, 2010
Stenoptilia zophodactylus (Duponchel, 1840)
Stenoptilodes taprobanes (Felder & Rogenhofer, 1875)
Titanoptilus laniger Bigot, 1969
Titanoptilus patellatus Meyrick, 1913
Trichoptilus animosus Meyrick, 1921
Trichoptilus cryphias Meyrick, 1912
Trichoptilus festus Meyrick, 1920
Trichoptilus maceratus Meyrick, 1909
Trichoptilus negotiosus Meyrick, 1926
Trichoptilus varius Meyrick, 1909
Trichoptilus viduus Meyrick, 1917
Trichoptilus vivax Meyrick, 1909

Family Pyralidae
About 506 species - see: List of moths of South Africa (Pyralidae)

Family Saturniidae
Adafroptilum incana (Sonthonnax, 1899)
Antistathmoptera daltonae Tams, 1935
Antistathmoptera rectangulata Pinhey, 1968
Argema mimosae (Boisduval, 1847)
Aurivillius arata (Westwood, 1849)
Aurivillius fusca (Rothschild, 1895)
Bunaea alcinoe (Stoll, 1780)
Bunaeopsis annabellae Lemaire & Rougeot, 1975
Bunaeopsis arabella (Aurivillius, 1893)
Bunaeopsis jacksoni (Jordan, 1908)
Campimoptilum kuntzei (Dewitz, 1881)
Cinabra hyperbius (Westwood, 1881)
Cirina forda (Westwood, 1849)
Decachorda fulvia (Druce, 1886)
Eochroa trimenii Felder, 1874
Epiphora bauhiniae (Guérin-Méneville, 1832)
Epiphora manowensis (Gschwandner, 1923)
Epiphora mythimnia (Westwood, 1849)
Gonimbrasia anna (Maassen & Weymer, 1885)
Gonimbrasia belina (Westwood, 1849)
Gonimbrasia bubo (Bouvier, 1930)
Gonimbrasia carnigiei (Janse, 1918)
Gonimbrasia cytherea (Fabricius, 1775)
Gonimbrasia perscitus (Darge, 1992)
Gonimbrasia rectilineata (Sonthonnax, 1899)
Gonimbrasia tyrrhea (Cramer, 1775)
Gonimbrasia wahlbergii (Boisduval, 1847)
Gonimbrasia zambesina (Walker, 1865)
Gynanisa ata Strand, 1911
Gynanisa maja (Klug, 1836)
Gynanisa meridiei Darge, 2008
Heniocha apollonia (Cramer, 1779)
Heniocha dyops (Maassen, 1872)
Heniocha marnois (Rogenhofer, 1891)
Holocerina agomensis (Karsch, 1896)
Holocerina smilax (Westwood, 1849)
Imbrasia ertli Rebel, 1904
Lobobunaea angasana (Westwood, 1849)
Lobobunaea phaedusa (Drury, 1782)
Ludia delegorguei (Boisduval, 1847)
Ludia goniata Rothschild, 1907
Ludia orinoptena Karsch, 1892
Melanocera dargei Terral, 1991
Melanocera menippe (Westwood, 1849)
Micragone cana (Aurivillius, 1893)
Micragone nubifera Bouvier, 1936
Nudaurelia carnegiei Janse, 1918
Nudaurelia gueinzii (Staudinger, 1872)
Nudaurelia macrothyris (Rothschild, 1906)
Orthogonioptilum adiegetum Karsch, 1892
Pselaphelia flavivitta (Walker, 1862)
Pseudaphelia apollinaris (Boisduval, 1847)
Pseudimbrasia deyrollei (J. Thomson, 1858)
Pseudobunaea epithyrena (Maassen & Weymer, 1885)
Pseudobunaea irius (Fabricius, 1793)
Pseudobunaea tyrrhena (Westwood, 1849)
Rohaniella pygmaea (Maassen & Weymer, 1885)
Tagoropsis flavinata (Walker, 1865)
Urota sinope (Westwood, 1849)
Usta terpsichore (Maassen & Weymer, 1885)
Usta wallengrenii (C. & R. Felder, 1859)
Vegetia dewitzi (Maassen & Weymer, 1885)
Vegetia ducalis Jordan, 1922
Vegetia grimmia (Geyer, 1831)

Family Sematuridae
Apoprogones hesperistis Hampson, 1903

Family Sesiidae
Alonina difformis Hampson, 1919
Alonina rygchiiformis Walker, 1856
Cabomina dracomontana de Freina, 2008
Cabomina monicae de Freina, 2008
Cabomina tsomoana de Freina, 2011
Chamanthedon chalypsa Hampson, 1919
Chamanthedon elymais (Druce, 1899)
Chamanthedon heliostoma Meyrick, 1926
Chamanthedon hilariformis (Walker, 1856)
Chamanthedon leucopleura Hampson, 1919
Chamanthedon ochracea (Walker, 1864)
Chamanthedon tapeina Hampson, 1919
Chamanthedon xanthopasta Hampson, 1919
Grypopalpia iridescens Hampson, 1919
Homogyna bartschi de Freina, 2011
Homogyna endopyra (Hampson, 1910)
Homogyna ignivittata Hampson, 1919
Homogyna pyrophora Hampson, 1919
Homogyna xanthophora (Hampson, 1910)
Hypanthedon marisa (Druce, 1899)
Melittia aureosquamata (Wallengren, 1863)
Melittia ectothyris Hampson, 1919
Melittia laniremis (Wallengren, 1860)
Melittia natalensis Butler, 1874
Melittia occidentalis Le Cerf, 1917
Melittia oedipus Oberthür, 1878
Melittia pyropis Hampson, 1919
Melittia rufodorsa Hampson, 1910
Melittia ursipes Walker, 1856
Monopetalotaxis candescens (Felder, 1874)
Monopetalotaxis doleriformis (Walker, 1856)
Monopetalotaxis luteopunctata de Freina, 2011
Monopetalotaxis pyrocraspis (Hampson, 1910)
Paranthrene mesothyris Hampson, 1919
Paranthrene pythes (Druce, 1899)
Paranthrene sanguipennis Meyrick, 1926
Pseudomelittia andraenipennis (Walker, 1856)
Sura bicolor Le Cerf, 1917
Sura melanochalcia (Le Cerf, 1917)
Sura xylocopiformis Walker, 1856
Synanthedon chromolaenae (Eichlin, 2009)
Synanthedon flavipalpis (Hampson, 1910)
Synanthedon mesochoriformis (Walker, 1856)
Synanthedon monozona (Hampson, 1910)
Synanthedon platyuriformis (Walker, 1856)
Synanthedon pyrethra (Hampson, 1910)
Synanthedon rhodia (Druce, 1899)
Synanthedon semirufa (Felder, 1874)
Synanthedon stenothyris (Meyrick, 1933)
Synanthedon tipuliformis (Clerck, 1759)
Thyranthrene adumbrata Bartsch, 2008
Thyranthrene metazonata Hampson, 1919
Tipulamima tricincta (Le Cerf, 1916)

Family Somabrachyidae
Parapsycharium paarlense Geertsema, 2000
Psycharium barnardi Geertsema, 1998
Psycharium kammanassiense Geertsema, 1998
Psycharium montanum Geertsema, 1998
Psycharium natalense Geertsema, 1998
Psycharium pellucens Herrich-Schäffer, 1856

Family Sphingidae
Acherontia atropos (Linnaeus, 1758)
Afroclanis calcareus (Rothschild & Jordan, 1907)
Afroclanis neavi (Hampson, 1910)
Agrius cingulata (Fabricius, 1775)
Agrius convolvuli (Linnaeus, 1758)
Andriasa contraria Walker, 1856
Antinephele lunulata Rothschild & Jordan, 1903
Antinephele maculifera Holland, 1889
Atemnora westermannii (Boisduval, 1875)
Basiothia aureata (Karsch, 1891)
Basiothia charis (Boisduval, 1875)
Basiothia medea (Fabricius, 1781)
Basiothia schenki (Möschler, 1872)
Batocnema africanus (Distant, 1899)
Centroctena imitans (Butler, 1882)
Cephonodes apus (Boisduval, 1833)
Cephonodes hylas (Linnaeus, 1771)
Cephonodes trochilus (Guérin-Méneville, 1843)
Coelonia fulvinotata (Butler, 1875)
Daphnis nerii (Linnaeus, 1758)
Euchloron megaera (Linnaeus, 1758)
Falcatula falcata (Rothschild & Jordan, 1903)
Hippotion balsaminae (Walker, 1856)
Hippotion celerio (Linnaeus, 1758)
Hippotion eson (Cramer, 1779)
Hippotion osiris (Dalman, 1823)
Hippotion rosae (Butler, 1882)
Hippotion roseipennis (Butler, 1882)
Hoplistopus penricei Rothschild & Jordan, 1903
Hyles livornica (Esper, 1780)
Leptoclanis pulchra Rothschild & Jordan, 1903
Leucophlebia afra Karsch, 1891
Leucostrophus alterhirundo d'Abrera, 1987
Likoma apicalis Rothschild & Jordan, 1903
Litosphingia corticea Jordan, 1920
Lophostethus dumolinii (Angas, 1849)
Macroglossum trochilus (Hübner, 1823)
Macropoliana natalensis (Butler, 1875)
Microsphinx pumilum (Boisduval, 1875)
Neoclanis basalis (Walker, 1866)
Neopolyptychus compar (Rothschild & Jordan, 1903)
Neopolyptychus convexus (Rothschild & Jordan, 1903)
Nephele accentifera (Palisot de Beauvois, 1821)
Nephele aequivalens (Walker, 1856)
Nephele argentifera (Walker, 1856)
Nephele bipartita Butler, 1878
Nephele comma Hopffer, 1857
Nephele lannini Jordan, 1926
Nephele peneus (Cramer, 1776)
Nephele rosae Butler, 1875
Nephele vau (Walker, 1856)
Odontosida magnificum (Rothschild, 1894)
Odontosida pusillus (Felder, 1874)
Oligographa juniperi (Boisduval, 1847)
Pantophaea favillacea (Walker, 1866)
Pantophaea oneili (Clark, 1925)
Phylloxiphia metria (Jordan, 1920)
Phylloxiphia punctum (Rothschild, 1907)
Phylloxiphia vicina (Rothschild & Jordan, 1915)
Platysphinx piabilis (Distant, 1897)
Polyptychoides grayii (Walker, 1856)
Polyptychopsis marshalli (Rothschild & Jordan, 1903)
Polyptychus baxteri Rothschild & Jordan, 1908
Polyptychus coryndoni Rothschild & Jordan, 1903
Praedora leucophaea Rothschild & Jordan, 1903
Praedora marshalli Rothschild & Jordan, 1903
Praedora plagiata Rothschild & Jordan, 1903
Pseudandriasa mutata (Walker, 1855)

Pseudoclanis diana Gehlen, 1922
Pseudoclanis molitor (Rothschild & Jordan, 1912)
Pseudoclanis postica (Walker, 1856)
Rhodafra marshalli Rothschild & Jordan, 1903
Rhodafra opheltes (Cramer, 1780)
Rufoclanis fulgurans (Rothschild & Jordan, 1903)
Rufoclanis jansei (Vári, 1964)
Rufoclanis numosae (Wallengren, 1860)
Sphingonaepiopsis ansorgei Rothschild, 1904
Sphingonaepiopsis nana (Walker, 1856)
Temnora elegans (Rothschild, 1895)
Temnora fumosa (Walker, 1856)
Temnora funebris (Holland, 1893)
Temnora iapygoides (Holland, 1889)
Temnora inornatum (Rothschild, 1894)
Temnora marginata (Walker, 1856)
Temnora murina (Walker, 1856)
Temnora namaqua Rothschild & Jordan, 1903
Temnora natalis Walker, 1856
Temnora plagiata Walker, 1856
Temnora pseudopylas (Rothschild, 1894)
Temnora pylades Rothschild & Jordan, 1903
Temnora pylas (Cramer, 1779)
Temnora robertsoni Carcasson, 1968
Temnora sardanus (Walker, 1856)
Temnora subapicalis Rothschild & Jordan, 1903
Temnora swynnertoni Stevenson, 1938
Temnora zantus (Herrich-Schäffer, 1854)
Theretra cajus (Cramer, 1777)
Theretra capensis (Linnaeus, 1764)
Theretra jugurtha (Boisduval, 1875)
Theretra monteironis (Butler, 1882)
Theretra orpheus (Herrich-Schäffer, 1854)
Xenosphingia jansei Jordan, 1920

Family Thyrididae
Arniocera auriguttata Hopffer, 1857
Arniocera elata Jordan, 1915
Arniocera erythropyga (Wallengren, 1860)
Arniocera lugubris Gaede, 1926
Arniocera zambesina (Walker, 1866)
Banisia aldabrana (Fryer, 1912)
Banisia jocatia (Whalley, 1971)
Banisia myrsusalis (Walker, 1859)
Banisia zamia (Whalley, 1971)
Bupota galbana Whalley, 1971
Bupota tranquilla Whalley, 1971
Cecidothyris orbiferalis (Gaede, 1917)
Cecidothyris pexa (Hampson, 1906)
Chrysotypus dawsoni Distant, 1897
Chrysotypus reticulatus Whalley, 1971
Chrysotypus splendida (Warren, 1899)
Chrysotypus subflavus Whalley, 1971
Cornuterus nigropunctula (Pagenstecher, 1892)
Dilophura caudata (Jordan, 1907)
Dysodia antennata Whalley, 1968
Dysodia binoculata Warren, 1901
Dysodia constellata Warren, 1908
Dysodia crassa (Walker, 1865)
Dysodia fenestratella Warren, 1900
Dysodia flavidula Warren, 1908
Dysodia intermedia (Walker, 1865)
Dysodia parvita Whalley, 1971
Dysodia subsignata Warren, 1908
Epaena candida Whalley, 1971
Epaena danista Whalley, 1971
Epaena trijuncta (Warren, 1898)
Gnathodes helvella Whalley, 1971
Hapana minima Whalley, 1971
Hapana verticalis (Warren, 1899)
Hypolamprus curviflua (Warren, 1898)
Hypolamprus gangaba Whalley, 1971
Kalenga ansorgei (Warren, 1899)
Kalenga culanota Whalley, 1971
Kalenga maculanota Whalley, 1971
Kuja squamigera (Pagenstecher, 1892)
Lelymena misalis Karsch, 1900
Marmax smaragdina (Butler, 1888)
Nakawa fuscibasis (Hampson, 1906)
Nemea nivosa Whalley, 1971
Netrocera hemichrysa (Hampson, 1910)
Netrocera setioides Felder, 1874
Rhodoneura abacha Whalley, 1971
Rhodoneura disjuncta (Gaede, 1929)
Rhodoneura flavicilia Hampson, 1906
Rhodoneura lacunosa Whalley, 1971
Rhodoneura roseola Whalley, 1971
Rhodoneura serraticornis (Warren, 1899)
Toosa glaucopiformis Walker, 1856

Family Tineidae
Acanthocheira loxopa (Meyrick, 1914)
Acridotarsa melipecta (Meyrick, 1915)
Amphixystis anchiala (Meyrick, 1909)
Amphixystis syntricha (Meyrick, 1910)
Antigambra amphitrocta Meyrick, 1927
Asymphyla asperata (Meyrick, 1918)
Ateliotum crymodes (Meyrick, 1908)
Ceratophaga obnoxia (Meyrick, 1917)
Ceratophaga tragoptila (Meyrick, 1917)
Ceratophaga vastellus (Zeller, 1852)
Ceratophaga xanthastis (Meyrick, 1908)
Cimitra horridella (Walker, 1863)
Cimitra spinignatha (Gozmány, 1968)
Clepticodes horocentra Meyrick, 1927
Contralissa catagrapta (Meyrick, 1927)
Cosmeombra doxochares (Meyrick, 1926)
Criticonoma chelonaea Meyrick, 1910
Criticonoma flaveata (Gozmány, 1968)
Crypsithyris fuscicoma Meyrick, 1937
Crypsithyris spissa Meyrick, 1918
Dasyses rugosella (Stainton, 1859)
Dicanica acrocentra Meyrick, 1913
Drosica abjectella Walker, 1963
Dryadaula zygodes (Meyrick, 1918)
Ectabola phaeocephala (Meyrick, 1918)
Edosa audens (Meyrick, 1921)
Edosa effulgens (Gozmány, 1965)
Edosa gypsoptera (Gozmány, 1968)
Edosa leucastis (Meyrick, 1908)
Edosa lissochlora (Meyrick, 1921)
Edosa oratrix (Meyrick, 1913)
Edosa perinipha (Gozmány, 1968)
Edosa rhodesica (Gozmány, 1967)
Edosa sanctifica (Meyrick, 1921)
Ellochotis caligata (Meyrick, 1913)
Ellochotis exilis Gozmány & Vári, 1973
Ellochotis fraudulenta (Meyrick, 1912)
Ellochotis infausta Meyrick, 1920
Ellochotis leontopa (Meyrick, 1908)
Ellochotis opifica (Meyrick, 1908)
Ellochotis picroxesta (Meyrick, 1926)
Ellochotis purpurea (Stainton, 1860)
Ellochotis territa (Meyrick, 1920)
Ellochotis trophias (Meyrick, 1908)
Ellochotis verecunda (Meyrick, 1911)
Erechthias glossophora (Meyrick, 1926)
Eriozancla trachyphaea (Meyrick, 1921)
Exonomasis exolescens (Meyrick, 1926)
Glaucostolella oxyteles (Meyrick, 1926)
Graphidivalva genitalis (Meyrick, 1913)
Hapsifera glebata Meyrick, 1908
Hapsifera meliceris Meyrick, 1908
Hapsifera ochroptila Meyrick, 1908
Hapsifera pardalea Meyrick, 1908
Harmaclona natalensis Bradley, 1953
Homalopsycha pericharacta Meyrick, 1924
Homalopsycha rapida (Meyrick, 1909)
Hyperbola chloristis (Meyrick, 1908)
Hyperbola phocina (Meyrick, 1908)
Janseana sceptica (Meyrick, 1910)
Janseana vibrata (Meyrick, 1913)
Lindera tessellatella Blanchard, 1852
Meessia sesquitertia (Meyrick, 1909)
Miarotagmata penetrata (Meyrick, 1911)
Minicorona tricarpa (Meyrick, 1913)
Monopis crocicapitella (Clemens, 1859)
Monopis lamprostola Meyrick, 1918
Monopis megalodelta Meyrick, 1908
Monopis meyricki Gozmány, 1967
Monopis monachella (Hübner, 1796)
Monopis nepheloscopa Meyrick, 1928
Monopis persimilis Gozmány, 1965
Monopis rejectella (Walker, 1864)
Monopis rutilicostella (Stainton, 1860)
Monopis speculella (Zeller, 1852)
Monopis transeans Gozmány, 1965
Morophaga soror Gozmány, 1965
Myrmecozela isopsamma Meyrick, 1920
Myrmecozela paurosperma Meyrick, 1926
Myrmecozela pogonopis Meyrick, 1926
Nearolyma pyrsocoma (Meyrick, 1937)
Nemapogon granella (Linnaeus, 1758)
Niditinea fuscella (Linnaeus, 1758)
Nyctocyrmata crotalopis (Meyrick, 1921)
Ochetoxena phaneraula Meyrick, 1920
Ocnophilella autocrypta (Meyrick, 1926)
Oinophila oxystyla (Meyrick, 1912)
Oinophila v-flava (Haworth, 1828)
Opogona chlorophanes Meyrick, 1908
Opogona cyrtomis Meyrick, 1915
Opogona dimidiatella Zeller, 1853
Opogona harpalea Meyrick, 1911
Opogona indiscreta (Meyrick, 1917)
Opogona iricharis (Meyrick, 1926)
Opogona ischnoscia Meyrick, 1928
Opogona omiastis Meyrick, 1937
Opogona omoscopa (Meyrick, 1893)
Opogona phaeochalca Meyrick, 1908
Opogona phaeocrana Meyrick, 1914
Opogona pyrometalla (Meyrick, 1928)
Opogona scaphopis Meyrick, 1909
Opogona trophis Meyrick, 1913
Organodesma erinacea (Walker, 1863)
Oxymachaeris euryzancla Meyrick, 1918
Oxymachaeris zulella (Walsingham, 1881)
Paraptica concinerata Meyrick, 1917
Pelecystola melanchares (Meyrick, 1937)
Pelecystola tephrinitis (Meyrick, 1911)
Perissomastix adamasta (Meyrick, 1909)
Perissomastix caryocephala (Meyrick, 1937)
Perissomastix damnificella (Zeller, 1852)
Perissomastix dentifera Gozmány & Vári, 1973
Perissomastix fulvicoma (Meyrick, 1921)
Perissomastix holopsamma (Meyrick, 1908)
Perissomastix mascherata Gozmány, 1965
Perissomastix meretrix (Meyrick, 1908)
Perissomastix nox Gozmány, 1968
Perissomastix varii Gozmány, 1967
Phaeoses pileigera (Meyrick, 1913)
Phyciodyta neritis Meyrick, 1918
Pitharcha fasciata (Ghesquière, 1940)
Pringleophaga crozetensis Enderlein, 1905
Pringleophaga kerguelensis Enderlein, 1905
Pringleophaga tetraula (Meyrick, 1926)
Propachyarthra convallata (Meyrick, 1918)
Proterospastis antiphracta (Meyrick, 1909)
Proterospastis barystacta Meyrick, 1937
Proterospastis craurota (Meyrick, 1920)
Proterospastis homestia (Meyrick, 1908)
Proterospastis megaspila (Meyrick, 1913)
Proterospastis taeniala (Gozmány, 1968)
Proterospastis trilinguis (Meyrick, 1920)
Proterospastis zebra (Walsingham, 1891)
Prothinodes arvicola Meyrick, 1924
Rhodobates paracosma (Meyrick, 1908)
Setomorpha rutella Zeller, 1852
Sphallestasis catharinae (Gozmány, 1968)
Sphallestasis ectofurca (Gozmány, 1965)
Sphallestasis euplocamis (Meyrick, 1918)
Sphallestasis hyalodes (Meyrick, 1913)
Sphallestasis jansei (Gozmány, 1965)
Sphallestasis oenopis (Meyrick, 1908)
Sphallestasis paramecis (Gozmány, 1969)
Sphallestasis paraxena (Meyrick, 1908)
Sphallestasis tanystis (Meyrick, 1908)
Stemagoris axylaea Meyrick, 1911
Struthisca agitata Meyrick, 1913
Struthisca areata Meyrick, 1908
Struthisca hormotris Meyrick, 1908
Struthisca omichlodes Meyrick, 1908
Tenaga nigripunctella (Haworth, 1828)
Tetracladessa chalcoxesta (Meyrick, 1920)
Theatrochora cosmophanes Meyrick, 1921
Tinea abactella Walker, 1863
Tinea dubiella Stainton, 1857
Tinea encausta Meyrick, 1911
Tinea nesiastis (Meyrick, 1911)
Tinea pentametra Meyrick, 1921
Tinea spilocoma Meyrick, 1920
Tinea spinizona Gozmány, 1968
Tinea squalida Gozmány, 1968
Tinea translucens Meyrick, 1917
Tinissa polystacta (Meyrick, 1918)
Tiquadra goochii Walsingham, 1881
Tiquadra lichenea Walsingham, 1897
Tracheloteina arctocephala (Meyrick, 1909)
Tracheloteina bilobata Gozmány, 1968
Tracheloteina farraginella (Zeller, 1852)
Tracheloteina ordinata (Meyrick, 1921)
Tracheloteina peloplaca (Meyrick, 1917)
Tracheloteina percastis (Meyrick, 1908)
Tracheloteina spinipenis Gozmány, 1968
Tracheloteina suspiciosa (Meyrick, 1912)
Transmixta fortuita (Meyrick, 1920)
Trichophaga cuspidata Gozmány, 1967
Trichophaga tapetzella (Linnaeus, 1767)
Wegneria speciosa (Meyrick, 1914)

Family Tischeriidae
Coptotriche africana Puplesis & Diskus, 2003
Coptotriche basipectinella Puplesis & Diskus, 2003
Tischeria martinkrugeri Puplesis & Diškus, 2003
Tischeria sparmanniae Puplesis & Diškus, 2003
Tischeria zestica Meyrick, 1911

Family Tortricidae
About 240 species - see: List of moths of South Africa (Tortricidae)

Family Uraniidae
Acropteris illiturata Warren, 1897
Dirades theclata (Guenée, 1858)
Epiplema anomala Janse, 1932
Epiplema asinina Warren, 1905
Epiplema illineata Warren, 1899
Epiplema inconspicua Janse, 1932
Epiplema pulveralis Janse, 1932
Epiplema reducta Janse, 1932
Epiplema tristis Janse, 1932
Heteroplema dependens Warren, 1902
Hypoplema fumella Janse, 1932
Leucoplema ansorgei (Warren, 1901)
Leucoplema dohertyi (Warren, 1904)
Leucoplema triumbrata (Warren, 1902)
Monoplema fumigera (Warren, 1905)
Pseudodirades lactea (Warren, 1897)
Urapteritra falcifera (Weymer, 1892)

Family Xyloryctidae
Cladophantis pristina Meyrick, 1925
Cladophantis spilozeucta Meyrick, 1927
Cladophantis xylophracta Meyrick, 1918
Eporycta chionaula Meyrick, 1920
Eporycta incanescens Meyrick, 1921
Eporycta tarbalea Meyrick, 1908
Eretmocera contermina Meyrick, 1926
Eretmocera derogatella (Walker, 1864)
Eretmocera florifera Meyrick, 1909
Eretmocera fuscipennis Zeller, 1852
Eretmocera laetissima Zeller, 1852
Eretmocera lunifera Zeller, 1852
Eretmocera miniata Walsingham, 1889
Eretmocera monophaea Meyrick, 1927
Eretmocera scatospila Zeller, 1852
Eretmocera syleuta Meyrick, 1926
Eupetochira axysta Meyrick, 1927
Eupetochira xystopala (Meyrick, 1908)
Exacristis euryopa Meyrick, 1921
Gemorodes diclera Meyrick, 1925
Glycynympha roseocostella (Walsingham, 1881)
Microphidias bacteriopis Meyrick, 1937
Paralogistis ochrura Meyrick, 1913
Proterochyta epicoena (Meyrick, 1914)
Scythris accumulata Meyrick, 1914
Scythris anthracodelta Meyrick, 1911
Scythris aquaria Meyrick, 1913
Scythris brachyplecta Meyrick, 1928
Scythris calciflua Meyrick, 1921
Scythris canispersa Meyrick, 1913
Scythris chloraema (Meyrick, 1887)
Scythris cometa Meyrick, 1909
Scythris cretiflua Meyrick, 1913
Scythris delodelta Meyrick, 1930
Scythris dimensa Meyrick, 1920
Scythris eloquens Meyrick, 1921
Scythris erudita Meyrick, 1917
Scythris exsoluta Meyrick, 1920
Scythris faeculenta Meyrick, 1912
Scythris farrata Meyrick, 1913
Scythris fluctuosa Meyrick, 1914
Scythris fonticola Meyrick, 1911
Scythris glaphyropa Meyrick, 1914
Scythris justifica Meyrick, 1911
Scythris lactanea Meyrick, 1913
Scythris latebrosa Meyrick, 1913
Scythris melanodora Meyrick, 1912
Scythris melanopleura Meyrick, 1914
Scythris meligastra Meyrick, 1920
Scythris mesoplecta Meyrick, 1921
Scythris nigrispersa Meyrick, 1918
Scythris obstans Meyrick, 1928
Scythris ochrantha Meyrick, 1909
Scythris pelochyta Meyrick, 1909
Scythris psamathota Meyrick, 1913
Scythris rivigera Meyrick, 1911
Scythris roseola Meyrick, 1912
Scythris sacharissa Meyrick, 1913
Scythris stagnosa Meyrick, 1913
Xylorycta artigena Meyrick, 1914

Family Yponomeutidae
Abacistis hexanoma Meyrick, 1913
Abacistis teligera Meyrick, 1914
Acrataula catapachna Meyrick, 1921
Amalthina lacteata Meyrick, 1914
Argyresthia liparodes Meyrick, 1914
Argyresthia pentanoma Meyrick, 1913
Argyresthia stilpnota Meyrick, 1913
Atteva carteri (Walsingham, 1891)
Embryonopsis halticella Eaton, 1875
Exaulistis trichogramma Meyrick, 1911
Hesperarcha pericentra Meyrick, 1918
Morotripta fatigata Meyrick, 1917
Palaetheta innocua Meyrick, 1911
Palaetheta ischnozona Meyrick, 1909
Parazelota dryotoma Meyrick, 1913
Parexaula isomima Meyrick, 1909
Plexippica verberata Meyrick, 1912
Prays citri (Millière, 1873)
Prays liophaea Meyrick, 1927
Ptiloteina nigricola (Meyrick, 1912)
Steganosticha remigera Meyrick, 1921
Teinoptila puncticornis (Walsingham, 1891)
Trochastica albifrenis Meyrick, 1913
Xyrosaris secreta Meyrick, 1912
Yponomeuta africanus Stainton, 1860
Yponomeuta athyris Meyrick, 1928
Yponomeuta fumigatus Zeller, 1852
Yponomeuta sistrophora Meyrick, 1909
Yponomeuta strigillatus Zeller, 1852
Yponomeuta subplumbellus Walsingham, 1881
Zygographa asaphochalca Meyrick, 1917

Family Ypsolophidae
Ypsolopha exsularis (Meyrick, 1937)
Ypsolopha scenites (Meyrick, 1909)

Family Zygaenidae
Anticrates crocophaea Meyrick, 1921
Anticrates electropis Meyrick, 1921
Astyloneura glennia (Jordan, 1907)
Astyloneura meridionalis (Hampson, 1920)
Astyloneura trefurthi Gaede, 1914
Coptoproctis languida (Zeller, 1852)
Janseola titaea (Druce, 1896)
Malamblia durbanica Jordan, 1907
Neurosymploca affinis Jordan, 1907
Neurosymploca caffra (Linnaeus, 1764)
Neurosymploca concinna (Dalman, 1823)
Neurosymploca hottentota (Herrich-Schäffer, 1854)
Neurosymploca meterythra Hampson, 1920
Neurosymploca pagana Kirby, 1892
Orna contraria (Walker, 1854)
Orna nebulosa (Guérin-Méneville, 1832)
Praezygaena agria (Distant, 1892)
Praezygaena conjuncta (Hampson, 1920)
Praezygaena lateralis (Jordan, 1907)
Praezygaena microsticha (Jordan, 1907)
Praezygaena myodes (Druce, 1899)
Praezygaena ochroptera (Felder, 1874)
Saliunca assimilis Jordan, 1907
Saliunca homochroa (Holland, 1897)
Saliunca meruana Aurivillius, 1910
Saliunca styx (Fabricius, 1775)
Saliuncella marshalli Jordan, 1907
Tascia finalis (Walker, 1854)
Tascia rhabdophora Vári, 2002
Tascia virescens Butler, 1876
Zutulba namaqua (Boisduval, 1847)
Zutulba ocellaris (Felder, 1874)

See also 
 List of butterflies of South Africa
 Wildlife of South Africa

References

External links 
 

 
South Africa
South Africa
Moths